

32001–32100 

|-bgcolor=#E9E9E9
| 32001 Golbin ||  ||  || April 29, 2000 || Socorro || LINEAR || — || align=right | 2.2 km || 
|-id=002 bgcolor=#fefefe
| 32002 Gorokhovsky ||  ||  || April 29, 2000 || Socorro || LINEAR || NYS || align=right | 4.8 km || 
|-id=003 bgcolor=#d6d6d6
| 32003 ||  || — || April 29, 2000 || Socorro || LINEAR || — || align=right | 11 km || 
|-id=004 bgcolor=#fefefe
| 32004 ||  || — || April 29, 2000 || Socorro || LINEAR || NYS || align=right | 2.2 km || 
|-id=005 bgcolor=#fefefe
| 32005 Roberthalfon ||  ||  || April 29, 2000 || Socorro || LINEAR || — || align=right | 2.0 km || 
|-id=006 bgcolor=#fefefe
| 32006 Hallisey ||  ||  || April 29, 2000 || Socorro || LINEAR || V || align=right | 1.4 km || 
|-id=007 bgcolor=#fefefe
| 32007 Amirhelmy ||  ||  || April 29, 2000 || Socorro || LINEAR || FLO || align=right | 4.9 km || 
|-id=008 bgcolor=#fefefe
| 32008 Adriángalád ||  ||  || April 29, 2000 || Socorro || LINEAR || moon || align=right | 3.6 km || 
|-id=009 bgcolor=#E9E9E9
| 32009 ||  || — || April 29, 2000 || Socorro || LINEAR || — || align=right | 4.0 km || 
|-id=010 bgcolor=#fefefe
| 32010 ||  || — || April 29, 2000 || Socorro || LINEAR || — || align=right | 3.1 km || 
|-id=011 bgcolor=#d6d6d6
| 32011 ||  || — || April 24, 2000 || Anderson Mesa || LONEOS || — || align=right | 8.4 km || 
|-id=012 bgcolor=#E9E9E9
| 32012 ||  || — || April 24, 2000 || Anderson Mesa || LONEOS || — || align=right | 4.8 km || 
|-id=013 bgcolor=#fefefe
| 32013 ||  || — || April 24, 2000 || Anderson Mesa || LONEOS || V || align=right | 1.5 km || 
|-id=014 bgcolor=#fefefe
| 32014 Bida ||  ||  || April 26, 2000 || Anderson Mesa || LONEOS || — || align=right | 3.1 km || 
|-id=015 bgcolor=#E9E9E9
| 32015 ||  || — || April 27, 2000 || Socorro || LINEAR || — || align=right | 2.5 km || 
|-id=016 bgcolor=#fefefe
| 32016 ||  || — || April 27, 2000 || Socorro || LINEAR || — || align=right | 3.6 km || 
|-id=017 bgcolor=#E9E9E9
| 32017 ||  || — || April 27, 2000 || Socorro || LINEAR || — || align=right | 2.4 km || 
|-id=018 bgcolor=#fefefe
| 32018 Robhenning ||  ||  || April 28, 2000 || Socorro || LINEAR || V || align=right | 2.1 km || 
|-id=019 bgcolor=#E9E9E9
| 32019 Krithikaiyer ||  ||  || April 29, 2000 || Socorro || LINEAR || — || align=right | 2.1 km || 
|-id=020 bgcolor=#E9E9E9
| 32020 ||  || — || April 27, 2000 || Socorro || LINEAR || EUN || align=right | 5.0 km || 
|-id=021 bgcolor=#fefefe
| 32021 Lilyjenkins ||  ||  || April 27, 2000 || Socorro || LINEAR || — || align=right | 3.6 km || 
|-id=022 bgcolor=#fefefe
| 32022 Sarahjenkins ||  ||  || April 27, 2000 || Socorro || LINEAR || — || align=right | 2.2 km || 
|-id=023 bgcolor=#fefefe
| 32023 ||  || — || April 29, 2000 || Socorro || LINEAR || NYS || align=right | 1.9 km || 
|-id=024 bgcolor=#fefefe
| 32024 ||  || — || April 29, 2000 || Socorro || LINEAR || NYS || align=right | 2.9 km || 
|-id=025 bgcolor=#fefefe
| 32025 Karanjerath ||  ||  || April 29, 2000 || Socorro || LINEAR || FLO || align=right | 2.1 km || 
|-id=026 bgcolor=#E9E9E9
| 32026 ||  || — || April 27, 2000 || Anderson Mesa || LONEOS || — || align=right | 2.9 km || 
|-id=027 bgcolor=#fefefe
| 32027 ||  || — || April 24, 2000 || Anderson Mesa || LONEOS || V || align=right | 2.0 km || 
|-id=028 bgcolor=#fefefe
| 32028 ||  || — || May 6, 2000 || Socorro || LINEAR || MAS || align=right | 3.3 km || 
|-id=029 bgcolor=#fefefe
| 32029 ||  || — || May 6, 2000 || Socorro || LINEAR || — || align=right | 2.6 km || 
|-id=030 bgcolor=#d6d6d6
| 32030 ||  || — || May 6, 2000 || Socorro || LINEAR || EOS || align=right | 7.1 km || 
|-id=031 bgcolor=#fefefe
| 32031 Joyjin ||  ||  || May 5, 2000 || Socorro || LINEAR || V || align=right | 1.1 km || 
|-id=032 bgcolor=#fefefe
| 32032 Askandola ||  ||  || May 5, 2000 || Socorro || LINEAR || — || align=right | 4.3 km || 
|-id=033 bgcolor=#fefefe
| 32033 Arjunkapoor ||  ||  || May 9, 2000 || Socorro || LINEAR || — || align=right | 2.6 km || 
|-id=034 bgcolor=#fefefe
| 32034 Sophiakorner ||  ||  || May 5, 2000 || Socorro || LINEAR || FLO || align=right | 2.5 km || 
|-id=035 bgcolor=#d6d6d6
| 32035 ||  || — || May 3, 2000 || Socorro || LINEAR || — || align=right | 5.2 km || 
|-id=036 bgcolor=#fefefe
| 32036 ||  || — || May 4, 2000 || Socorro || LINEAR || PHO || align=right | 3.6 km || 
|-id=037 bgcolor=#fefefe
| 32037 Deepikakurup ||  ||  || May 6, 2000 || Socorro || LINEAR || NYS || align=right | 4.9 km || 
|-id=038 bgcolor=#fefefe
| 32038 Kwiecinski ||  ||  || May 6, 2000 || Socorro || LINEAR || — || align=right | 2.5 km || 
|-id=039 bgcolor=#FA8072
| 32039 ||  || — || May 7, 2000 || Socorro || LINEAR || moon || align=right | 3.4 km || 
|-id=040 bgcolor=#fefefe
| 32040 ||  || — || May 7, 2000 || Socorro || LINEAR || — || align=right | 2.1 km || 
|-id=041 bgcolor=#fefefe
| 32041 ||  || — || May 7, 2000 || Socorro || LINEAR || — || align=right | 3.3 km || 
|-id=042 bgcolor=#fefefe
| 32042 ||  || — || May 7, 2000 || Socorro || LINEAR || — || align=right | 2.0 km || 
|-id=043 bgcolor=#E9E9E9
| 32043 ||  || — || May 7, 2000 || Socorro || LINEAR || — || align=right | 3.6 km || 
|-id=044 bgcolor=#fefefe
| 32044 Lakmazaheri ||  ||  || May 7, 2000 || Socorro || LINEAR || — || align=right | 2.6 km || 
|-id=045 bgcolor=#fefefe
| 32045 ||  || — || May 7, 2000 || Socorro || LINEAR || — || align=right | 5.2 km || 
|-id=046 bgcolor=#fefefe
| 32046 ||  || — || May 7, 2000 || Socorro || LINEAR || — || align=right | 3.1 km || 
|-id=047 bgcolor=#E9E9E9
| 32047 Wenjiali ||  ||  || May 7, 2000 || Socorro || LINEAR || — || align=right | 2.6 km || 
|-id=048 bgcolor=#fefefe
| 32048 Kathyliu ||  ||  || May 7, 2000 || Socorro || LINEAR || NYS || align=right | 2.7 km || 
|-id=049 bgcolor=#fefefe
| 32049 Jonathanma ||  ||  || May 7, 2000 || Socorro || LINEAR || V || align=right | 2.7 km || 
|-id=050 bgcolor=#fefefe
| 32050 ||  || — || May 7, 2000 || Socorro || LINEAR || — || align=right | 3.6 km || 
|-id=051 bgcolor=#fefefe
| 32051 Sadhikamalladi ||  ||  || May 7, 2000 || Socorro || LINEAR || SUL || align=right | 5.7 km || 
|-id=052 bgcolor=#fefefe
| 32052 Diyamathur ||  ||  || May 7, 2000 || Socorro || LINEAR || — || align=right | 2.8 km || 
|-id=053 bgcolor=#fefefe
| 32053 Demetrimaxim ||  ||  || May 7, 2000 || Socorro || LINEAR || — || align=right | 3.0 km || 
|-id=054 bgcolor=#fefefe
| 32054 Musunuri ||  ||  || May 7, 2000 || Socorro || LINEAR || FLO || align=right | 2.8 km || 
|-id=055 bgcolor=#d6d6d6
| 32055 ||  || — || May 7, 2000 || Socorro || LINEAR || — || align=right | 5.8 km || 
|-id=056 bgcolor=#fefefe
| 32056 Abrarnadroo ||  ||  || May 7, 2000 || Socorro || LINEAR || — || align=right | 1.8 km || 
|-id=057 bgcolor=#fefefe
| 32057 Ethannovek ||  ||  || May 7, 2000 || Socorro || LINEAR || — || align=right | 2.0 km || 
|-id=058 bgcolor=#d6d6d6
| 32058 Charlesnoyes ||  ||  || May 7, 2000 || Socorro || LINEAR || — || align=right | 2.7 km || 
|-id=059 bgcolor=#fefefe
| 32059 Ruchipandya ||  ||  || May 7, 2000 || Socorro || LINEAR || FLO || align=right | 2.5 km || 
|-id=060 bgcolor=#d6d6d6
| 32060 Wyattpontius ||  ||  || May 7, 2000 || Socorro || LINEAR || — || align=right | 7.1 km || 
|-id=061 bgcolor=#fefefe
| 32061 ||  || — || May 9, 2000 || Socorro || LINEAR || KLI || align=right | 6.3 km || 
|-id=062 bgcolor=#fefefe
| 32062 Amolpunjabi ||  ||  || May 9, 2000 || Socorro || LINEAR || NYS || align=right | 1.3 km || 
|-id=063 bgcolor=#E9E9E9
| 32063 Pusapaty ||  ||  || May 9, 2000 || Socorro || LINEAR || — || align=right | 3.6 km || 
|-id=064 bgcolor=#fefefe
| 32064 ||  || — || May 9, 2000 || Socorro || LINEAR || — || align=right | 6.2 km || 
|-id=065 bgcolor=#fefefe
| 32065 Radulovacki ||  ||  || May 9, 2000 || Socorro || LINEAR || — || align=right | 2.8 km || 
|-id=066 bgcolor=#fefefe
| 32066 Ramayya ||  ||  || May 9, 2000 || Socorro || LINEAR || V || align=right | 2.3 km || 
|-id=067 bgcolor=#fefefe
| 32067 Ranganathan ||  ||  || May 6, 2000 || Socorro || LINEAR || V || align=right | 3.1 km || 
|-id=068 bgcolor=#E9E9E9
| 32068 ||  || — || May 6, 2000 || Socorro || LINEAR || INOfast || align=right | 4.0 km || 
|-id=069 bgcolor=#fefefe
| 32069 Mayarao ||  ||  || May 7, 2000 || Socorro || LINEAR || V || align=right | 2.3 km || 
|-id=070 bgcolor=#fefefe
| 32070 Michaelretchin ||  ||  || May 7, 2000 || Socorro || LINEAR || — || align=right | 2.6 km || 
|-id=071 bgcolor=#E9E9E9
| 32071 Matthewretchin ||  ||  || May 7, 2000 || Socorro || LINEAR || — || align=right | 5.3 km || 
|-id=072 bgcolor=#d6d6d6
| 32072 Revanur ||  ||  || May 7, 2000 || Socorro || LINEAR || — || align=right | 7.0 km || 
|-id=073 bgcolor=#fefefe
| 32073 Cassidyryan ||  ||  || May 7, 2000 || Socorro || LINEAR || — || align=right | 2.9 km || 
|-id=074 bgcolor=#fefefe
| 32074 Kevinsadhu ||  ||  || May 10, 2000 || Socorro || LINEAR || — || align=right | 2.6 km || 
|-id=075 bgcolor=#d6d6d6
| 32075 ||  || — || May 1, 2000 || Kitt Peak || Spacewatch || EOS || align=right | 7.1 km || 
|-id=076 bgcolor=#fefefe
| 32076 ||  || — || May 2, 2000 || Anderson Mesa || LONEOS || — || align=right | 3.4 km || 
|-id=077 bgcolor=#fefefe
| 32077 ||  || — || May 2, 2000 || Anderson Mesa || LONEOS || FLO || align=right | 1.8 km || 
|-id=078 bgcolor=#fefefe
| 32078 Jamesavoldelli ||  ||  || May 5, 2000 || Socorro || LINEAR || — || align=right | 1.6 km || 
|-id=079 bgcolor=#fefefe
| 32079 Hughsavoldelli ||  ||  || May 5, 2000 || Socorro || LINEAR || — || align=right | 2.6 km || 
|-id=080 bgcolor=#fefefe
| 32080 Sanashareef ||  ||  || May 7, 2000 || Socorro || LINEAR || — || align=right | 3.2 km || 
|-id=081 bgcolor=#fefefe
| 32081 ||  || — || May 9, 2000 || Socorro || LINEAR || — || align=right | 1.9 km || 
|-id=082 bgcolor=#d6d6d6
| 32082 Sominsky ||  ||  || May 7, 2000 || Socorro || LINEAR || THM || align=right | 3.9 km || 
|-id=083 bgcolor=#E9E9E9
| 32083 || 2000 KO || — || May 24, 2000 || Črni Vrh || Črni Vrh || — || align=right | 2.9 km || 
|-id=084 bgcolor=#fefefe
| 32084 ||  || — || May 28, 2000 || Kitt Peak || Spacewatch || V || align=right | 1.6 km || 
|-id=085 bgcolor=#E9E9E9
| 32085 Tomback ||  ||  || May 27, 2000 || Socorro || LINEAR || — || align=right | 4.5 km || 
|-id=086 bgcolor=#d6d6d6
| 32086 Viviannetu ||  ||  || May 28, 2000 || Socorro || LINEAR || HYG || align=right | 6.4 km || 
|-id=087 bgcolor=#d6d6d6
| 32087 Vemulapalli ||  ||  || May 28, 2000 || Socorro || LINEAR || KOR || align=right | 4.6 km || 
|-id=088 bgcolor=#E9E9E9
| 32088 Liamwallace ||  ||  || May 28, 2000 || Socorro || LINEAR || — || align=right | 3.3 km || 
|-id=089 bgcolor=#fefefe
| 32089 Wojtania ||  ||  || May 28, 2000 || Socorro || LINEAR || MAS || align=right | 2.2 km || 
|-id=090 bgcolor=#fefefe
| 32090 Craigworley ||  ||  || May 28, 2000 || Socorro || LINEAR || — || align=right | 3.8 km || 
|-id=091 bgcolor=#fefefe
| 32091 Jasonwu ||  ||  || May 28, 2000 || Socorro || LINEAR || — || align=right | 2.1 km || 
|-id=092 bgcolor=#E9E9E9
| 32092 Brianxia ||  ||  || May 28, 2000 || Socorro || LINEAR || — || align=right | 2.9 km || 
|-id=093 bgcolor=#fefefe
| 32093 Zhengyan ||  ||  || May 28, 2000 || Socorro || LINEAR || — || align=right | 3.4 km || 
|-id=094 bgcolor=#d6d6d6
| 32094 ||  || — || May 28, 2000 || Socorro || LINEAR || — || align=right | 6.1 km || 
|-id=095 bgcolor=#E9E9E9
| 32095 ||  || — || May 24, 2000 || Kitt Peak || Spacewatch || — || align=right | 5.8 km || 
|-id=096 bgcolor=#E9E9E9
| 32096 Puckett ||  ||  || May 27, 2000 || Anza || M. Collins, M. White || — || align=right | 2.9 km || 
|-id=097 bgcolor=#E9E9E9
| 32097 ||  || — || May 24, 2000 || Kitt Peak || Spacewatch || — || align=right | 2.6 km || 
|-id=098 bgcolor=#fefefe
| 32098 ||  || — || May 25, 2000 || Kitt Peak || Spacewatch || FLO || align=right | 1.8 km || 
|-id=099 bgcolor=#E9E9E9
| 32099 ||  || — || May 28, 2000 || Socorro || LINEAR || EUN || align=right | 4.0 km || 
|-id=100 bgcolor=#fefefe
| 32100 ||  || — || May 28, 2000 || Kitt Peak || Spacewatch || — || align=right | 3.4 km || 
|}

32101–32200 

|-bgcolor=#E9E9E9
| 32101 Williamyin ||  ||  || May 29, 2000 || Socorro || LINEAR || — || align=right | 3.0 km || 
|-id=102 bgcolor=#E9E9E9
| 32102 ||  || — || May 23, 2000 || Anderson Mesa || LONEOS || — || align=right | 2.7 km || 
|-id=103 bgcolor=#fefefe
| 32103 Reʼemsari ||  ||  || May 23, 2000 || Anderson Mesa || LONEOS || ERI || align=right | 7.4 km || 
|-id=104 bgcolor=#fefefe
| 32104 ||  || — || May 24, 2000 || Anderson Mesa || LONEOS || — || align=right | 2.2 km || 
|-id=105 bgcolor=#fefefe
| 32105 ||  || — || May 24, 2000 || Anderson Mesa || LONEOS || — || align=right | 2.8 km || 
|-id=106 bgcolor=#E9E9E9
| 32106 ||  || — || May 24, 2000 || Anderson Mesa || LONEOS || — || align=right | 2.1 km || 
|-id=107 bgcolor=#fefefe
| 32107 Ylitalo ||  ||  || May 27, 2000 || Socorro || LINEAR || — || align=right | 1.9 km || 
|-id=108 bgcolor=#fefefe
| 32108 Jovanzhang ||  ||  || May 27, 2000 || Socorro || LINEAR || V || align=right | 2.3 km || 
|-id=109 bgcolor=#fefefe
| 32109 ||  || — || May 28, 2000 || Anderson Mesa || LONEOS || — || align=right | 4.7 km || 
|-id=110 bgcolor=#E9E9E9
| 32110 ||  || — || May 28, 2000 || Anderson Mesa || LONEOS || — || align=right | 7.1 km || 
|-id=111 bgcolor=#E9E9E9
| 32111 ||  || — || May 28, 2000 || Anderson Mesa || LONEOS || — || align=right | 5.7 km || 
|-id=112 bgcolor=#E9E9E9
| 32112 ||  || — || May 28, 2000 || Anderson Mesa || LONEOS || GEF || align=right | 4.7 km || 
|-id=113 bgcolor=#d6d6d6
| 32113 ||  || — || May 28, 2000 || Anderson Mesa || LONEOS || EOS || align=right | 5.8 km || 
|-id=114 bgcolor=#E9E9E9
| 32114 ||  || — || May 27, 2000 || Socorro || LINEAR || EUN || align=right | 4.8 km || 
|-id=115 bgcolor=#fefefe
| 32115 ||  || — || May 27, 2000 || Socorro || LINEAR || — || align=right | 1.9 km || 
|-id=116 bgcolor=#E9E9E9
| 32116 ||  || — || June 4, 2000 || Socorro || LINEAR || MAR || align=right | 4.9 km || 
|-id=117 bgcolor=#E9E9E9
| 32117 ||  || — || June 5, 2000 || Socorro || LINEAR || DOR || align=right | 7.3 km || 
|-id=118 bgcolor=#fefefe
| 32118 ||  || — || June 6, 2000 || Reedy Creek || J. Broughton || — || align=right | 2.3 km || 
|-id=119 bgcolor=#d6d6d6
| 32119 ||  || — || June 6, 2000 || Kitt Peak || Spacewatch || — || align=right | 6.3 km || 
|-id=120 bgcolor=#fefefe
| 32120 Stevezheng ||  ||  || June 6, 2000 || Socorro || LINEAR || NYS || align=right | 2.8 km || 
|-id=121 bgcolor=#fefefe
| 32121 Joshuazhou ||  ||  || June 5, 2000 || Socorro || LINEAR || — || align=right | 3.3 km || 
|-id=122 bgcolor=#FA8072
| 32122 ||  || — || June 7, 2000 || Socorro || LINEAR || — || align=right | 3.8 km || 
|-id=123 bgcolor=#d6d6d6
| 32123 ||  || — || June 1, 2000 || Socorro || LINEAR || MEL || align=right | 13 km || 
|-id=124 bgcolor=#E9E9E9
| 32124 ||  || — || June 4, 2000 || Socorro || LINEAR || HNS || align=right | 3.6 km || 
|-id=125 bgcolor=#d6d6d6
| 32125 ||  || — || June 4, 2000 || Socorro || LINEAR || ALA || align=right | 17 km || 
|-id=126 bgcolor=#fefefe
| 32126 ||  || — || June 4, 2000 || Socorro || LINEAR || CIM || align=right | 6.1 km || 
|-id=127 bgcolor=#d6d6d6
| 32127 ||  || — || June 4, 2000 || Socorro || LINEAR || — || align=right | 6.0 km || 
|-id=128 bgcolor=#fefefe
| 32128 Jayzussman ||  ||  || June 5, 2000 || Socorro || LINEAR || — || align=right | 3.4 km || 
|-id=129 bgcolor=#fefefe
| 32129 ||  || — || June 7, 2000 || Socorro || LINEAR || — || align=right | 4.6 km || 
|-id=130 bgcolor=#E9E9E9
| 32130 ||  || — || June 1, 2000 || Socorro || LINEAR || — || align=right | 5.9 km || 
|-id=131 bgcolor=#fefefe
| 32131 Ravindran ||  ||  || June 4, 2000 || Socorro || LINEAR || V || align=right | 1.8 km || 
|-id=132 bgcolor=#fefefe
| 32132 Andrewamini ||  ||  || June 4, 2000 || Socorro || LINEAR || — || align=right | 2.8 km || 
|-id=133 bgcolor=#E9E9E9
| 32133 ||  || — || June 4, 2000 || Socorro || LINEAR || — || align=right | 3.7 km || 
|-id=134 bgcolor=#E9E9E9
| 32134 ||  || — || June 7, 2000 || Socorro || LINEAR || — || align=right | 4.5 km || 
|-id=135 bgcolor=#d6d6d6
| 32135 ||  || — || June 8, 2000 || Socorro || LINEAR || — || align=right | 13 km || 
|-id=136 bgcolor=#E9E9E9
| 32136 ||  || — || June 8, 2000 || Socorro || LINEAR || — || align=right | 8.8 km || 
|-id=137 bgcolor=#E9E9E9
| 32137 ||  || — || June 8, 2000 || Socorro || LINEAR || — || align=right | 9.9 km || 
|-id=138 bgcolor=#E9E9E9
| 32138 ||  || — || June 8, 2000 || Socorro || LINEAR || — || align=right | 5.7 km || 
|-id=139 bgcolor=#E9E9E9
| 32139 ||  || — || June 8, 2000 || Socorro || LINEAR || EUN || align=right | 4.9 km || 
|-id=140 bgcolor=#E9E9E9
| 32140 ||  || — || June 8, 2000 || Socorro || LINEAR || — || align=right | 8.4 km || 
|-id=141 bgcolor=#E9E9E9
| 32141 ||  || — || June 1, 2000 || Socorro || LINEAR || HNS || align=right | 3.6 km || 
|-id=142 bgcolor=#E9E9E9
| 32142 ||  || — || June 3, 2000 || Anderson Mesa || LONEOS || — || align=right | 7.6 km || 
|-id=143 bgcolor=#fefefe
| 32143 ||  || — || June 11, 2000 || Valinhos || P. R. Holvorcem || — || align=right | 5.1 km || 
|-id=144 bgcolor=#E9E9E9
| 32144 ||  || — || June 9, 2000 || Anderson Mesa || LONEOS || DOR || align=right | 7.7 km || 
|-id=145 bgcolor=#fefefe
| 32145 Katberman ||  ||  || June 7, 2000 || Socorro || LINEAR || — || align=right | 4.4 km || 
|-id=146 bgcolor=#fefefe
| 32146 Paigebrown ||  ||  || June 7, 2000 || Socorro || LINEAR || — || align=right | 4.0 km || 
|-id=147 bgcolor=#fefefe
| 32147 ||  || — || June 6, 2000 || Anderson Mesa || LONEOS || — || align=right | 3.7 km || 
|-id=148 bgcolor=#fefefe
| 32148 ||  || — || June 6, 2000 || Anderson Mesa || LONEOS || NYS || align=right | 1.9 km || 
|-id=149 bgcolor=#fefefe
| 32149 ||  || — || June 6, 2000 || Anderson Mesa || LONEOS || — || align=right | 2.8 km || 
|-id=150 bgcolor=#d6d6d6
| 32150 ||  || — || June 6, 2000 || Anderson Mesa || LONEOS || — || align=right | 9.9 km || 
|-id=151 bgcolor=#fefefe
| 32151 Seanmarshall ||  ||  || June 5, 2000 || Anderson Mesa || LONEOS || NYS || align=right | 2.3 km || 
|-id=152 bgcolor=#d6d6d6
| 32152 ||  || — || June 3, 2000 || Anderson Mesa || LONEOS || — || align=right | 8.2 km || 
|-id=153 bgcolor=#E9E9E9
| 32153 ||  || — || June 3, 2000 || Anderson Mesa || LONEOS || — || align=right | 11 km || 
|-id=154 bgcolor=#fefefe
| 32154 || 2000 MH || — || June 23, 2000 || Reedy Creek || J. Broughton || PHO || align=right | 4.3 km || 
|-id=155 bgcolor=#E9E9E9
| 32155 || 2000 MN || — || June 22, 2000 || Kitt Peak || Spacewatch || — || align=right | 2.2 km || 
|-id=156 bgcolor=#fefefe
| 32156 || 2000 MY || — || June 24, 2000 || Reedy Creek || J. Broughton || — || align=right | 2.5 km || 
|-id=157 bgcolor=#E9E9E9
| 32157 ||  || — || June 26, 2000 || Reedy Creek || J. Broughton || — || align=right | 5.2 km || 
|-id=158 bgcolor=#E9E9E9
| 32158 ||  || — || June 29, 2000 || Reedy Creek || J. Broughton || — || align=right | 4.5 km || 
|-id=159 bgcolor=#d6d6d6
| 32159 ||  || — || June 25, 2000 || Haleakala || NEAT || THM || align=right | 8.1 km || 
|-id=160 bgcolor=#fefefe
| 32160 ||  || — || June 27, 2000 || Bergisch Gladbach || W. Bickel || NYS || align=right | 2.2 km || 
|-id=161 bgcolor=#E9E9E9
| 32161 ||  || — || June 24, 2000 || Socorro || LINEAR || GEF || align=right | 4.1 km || 
|-id=162 bgcolor=#d6d6d6
| 32162 ||  || — || June 25, 2000 || Socorro || LINEAR || — || align=right | 15 km || 
|-id=163 bgcolor=#fefefe
| 32163 Claireburch ||  ||  || June 24, 2000 || Socorro || LINEAR || — || align=right | 3.9 km || 
|-id=164 bgcolor=#E9E9E9
| 32164 ||  || — || July 7, 2000 || Socorro || LINEAR || EUN || align=right | 5.5 km || 
|-id=165 bgcolor=#E9E9E9
| 32165 ||  || — || July 9, 2000 || Farpoint || G. Hug || DOR || align=right | 6.2 km || 
|-id=166 bgcolor=#fefefe
| 32166 ||  || — || July 3, 2000 || Kitt Peak || Spacewatch || — || align=right | 3.0 km || 
|-id=167 bgcolor=#fefefe
| 32167 ||  || — || July 5, 2000 || Kitt Peak || Spacewatch || ERI || align=right | 5.4 km || 
|-id=168 bgcolor=#fefefe
| 32168 ||  || — || July 10, 2000 || Valinhos || P. R. Holvorcem || V || align=right | 2.9 km || 
|-id=169 bgcolor=#E9E9E9
| 32169 ||  || — || July 6, 2000 || Socorro || LINEAR || — || align=right | 5.6 km || 
|-id=170 bgcolor=#d6d6d6
| 32170 ||  || — || July 6, 2000 || Socorro || LINEAR || — || align=right | 5.6 km || 
|-id=171 bgcolor=#fefefe
| 32171 ||  || — || July 1, 2000 || Siding Spring || R. H. McNaught || — || align=right | 3.0 km || 
|-id=172 bgcolor=#d6d6d6
| 32172 ||  || — || July 10, 2000 || Valinhos || P. R. Holvorcem || — || align=right | 7.7 km || 
|-id=173 bgcolor=#d6d6d6
| 32173 ||  || — || July 5, 2000 || Anderson Mesa || LONEOS || — || align=right | 11 km || 
|-id=174 bgcolor=#E9E9E9
| 32174 ||  || — || July 5, 2000 || Anderson Mesa || LONEOS || PAD || align=right | 4.4 km || 
|-id=175 bgcolor=#d6d6d6
| 32175 ||  || — || July 5, 2000 || Anderson Mesa || LONEOS || — || align=right | 7.8 km || 
|-id=176 bgcolor=#fefefe
| 32176 ||  || — || July 5, 2000 || Anderson Mesa || LONEOS || — || align=right | 3.7 km || 
|-id=177 bgcolor=#d6d6d6
| 32177 ||  || — || July 5, 2000 || Anderson Mesa || LONEOS || — || align=right | 11 km || 
|-id=178 bgcolor=#fefefe
| 32178 ||  || — || July 5, 2000 || Anderson Mesa || LONEOS || — || align=right | 2.9 km || 
|-id=179 bgcolor=#d6d6d6
| 32179 ||  || — || July 5, 2000 || Anderson Mesa || LONEOS || — || align=right | 3.6 km || 
|-id=180 bgcolor=#fefefe
| 32180 ||  || — || July 5, 2000 || Anderson Mesa || LONEOS || — || align=right | 3.4 km || 
|-id=181 bgcolor=#E9E9E9
| 32181 ||  || — || July 5, 2000 || Anderson Mesa || LONEOS || HEN || align=right | 3.4 km || 
|-id=182 bgcolor=#E9E9E9
| 32182 ||  || — || July 5, 2000 || Anderson Mesa || LONEOS || MIS || align=right | 9.9 km || 
|-id=183 bgcolor=#E9E9E9
| 32183 ||  || — || July 5, 2000 || Anderson Mesa || LONEOS || HEN || align=right | 3.0 km || 
|-id=184 bgcolor=#E9E9E9
| 32184 Yamaura ||  ||  || July 8, 2000 || Bisei SG Center || BATTeRS || EUN || align=right | 3.6 km || 
|-id=185 bgcolor=#d6d6d6
| 32185 ||  || — || July 5, 2000 || Anderson Mesa || LONEOS || 7:4 || align=right | 9.6 km || 
|-id=186 bgcolor=#E9E9E9
| 32186 ||  || — || July 5, 2000 || Anderson Mesa || LONEOS || MAR || align=right | 4.2 km || 
|-id=187 bgcolor=#E9E9E9
| 32187 ||  || — || July 5, 2000 || Kitt Peak || Spacewatch || — || align=right | 6.1 km || 
|-id=188 bgcolor=#d6d6d6
| 32188 ||  || — || July 4, 2000 || Anderson Mesa || LONEOS || ALA || align=right | 12 km || 
|-id=189 bgcolor=#E9E9E9
| 32189 ||  || — || July 4, 2000 || Anderson Mesa || LONEOS || HEN || align=right | 3.3 km || 
|-id=190 bgcolor=#d6d6d6
| 32190 ||  || — || July 4, 2000 || Anderson Mesa || LONEOS || EMA || align=right | 9.8 km || 
|-id=191 bgcolor=#E9E9E9
| 32191 ||  || — || July 4, 2000 || Anderson Mesa || LONEOS || — || align=right | 9.4 km || 
|-id=192 bgcolor=#E9E9E9
| 32192 ||  || — || July 4, 2000 || Anderson Mesa || LONEOS || — || align=right | 6.8 km || 
|-id=193 bgcolor=#fefefe
| 32193 ||  || — || July 4, 2000 || Anderson Mesa || LONEOS || — || align=right | 3.1 km || 
|-id=194 bgcolor=#d6d6d6
| 32194 ||  || — || July 4, 2000 || Anderson Mesa || LONEOS || EOS || align=right | 5.0 km || 
|-id=195 bgcolor=#d6d6d6
| 32195 ||  || — || July 2, 2000 || Kitt Peak || Spacewatch || HYG || align=right | 9.9 km || 
|-id=196 bgcolor=#fefefe
| 32196 || 2000 OK || — || July 19, 2000 || Farpoint || G. Hug || ERI || align=right | 4.5 km || 
|-id=197 bgcolor=#d6d6d6
| 32197 || 2000 OV || — || July 24, 2000 || Reedy Creek || J. Broughton || HYG || align=right | 7.6 km || 
|-id=198 bgcolor=#d6d6d6
| 32198 ||  || — || July 24, 2000 || Kitt Peak || Spacewatch || VER || align=right | 7.7 km || 
|-id=199 bgcolor=#E9E9E9
| 32199 ||  || — || July 27, 2000 || Črni Vrh || Črni Vrh || — || align=right | 2.9 km || 
|-id=200 bgcolor=#d6d6d6
| 32200 Seiicyoshida ||  ||  || July 28, 2000 || Dynic || Y. Ikari || MEL || align=right | 12 km || 
|}

32201–32300 

|-bgcolor=#d6d6d6
| 32201 ||  || — || July 29, 2000 || Reedy Creek || J. Broughton || KOR || align=right | 3.8 km || 
|-id=202 bgcolor=#E9E9E9
| 32202 ||  || — || July 29, 2000 || Reedy Creek || J. Broughton || PAD || align=right | 8.6 km || 
|-id=203 bgcolor=#E9E9E9
| 32203 ||  || — || July 23, 2000 || Socorro || LINEAR || EUN || align=right | 5.8 km || 
|-id=204 bgcolor=#E9E9E9
| 32204 ||  || — || July 24, 2000 || Socorro || LINEAR || — || align=right | 6.2 km || 
|-id=205 bgcolor=#d6d6d6
| 32205 ||  || — || July 24, 2000 || Socorro || LINEAR || — || align=right | 13 km || 
|-id=206 bgcolor=#E9E9E9
| 32206 ||  || — || July 29, 2000 || Socorro || LINEAR || — || align=right | 5.2 km || 
|-id=207 bgcolor=#E9E9E9
| 32207 Mairepercy ||  ||  || July 28, 2000 || OCA-Anza || M. Collins, M. Gahran || — || align=right | 5.1 km || 
|-id=208 bgcolor=#E9E9E9
| 32208 Johnpercy ||  ||  || July 28, 2000 || OCA-Anza || M. Collins, M. Gahran || PAD || align=right | 6.8 km || 
|-id=209 bgcolor=#E9E9E9
| 32209 ||  || — || July 23, 2000 || Socorro || LINEAR || — || align=right | 9.6 km || 
|-id=210 bgcolor=#E9E9E9
| 32210 ||  || — || July 23, 2000 || Socorro || LINEAR || — || align=right | 3.5 km || 
|-id=211 bgcolor=#E9E9E9
| 32211 ||  || — || July 23, 2000 || Socorro || LINEAR || — || align=right | 4.7 km || 
|-id=212 bgcolor=#fefefe
| 32212 ||  || — || July 23, 2000 || Socorro || LINEAR || — || align=right | 4.4 km || 
|-id=213 bgcolor=#d6d6d6
| 32213 Joshuachoe ||  ||  || July 23, 2000 || Socorro || LINEAR || KOR || align=right | 3.5 km || 
|-id=214 bgcolor=#E9E9E9
| 32214 Colburn ||  ||  || July 23, 2000 || Socorro || LINEAR || — || align=right | 4.5 km || 
|-id=215 bgcolor=#d6d6d6
| 32215 ||  || — || July 23, 2000 || Socorro || LINEAR || THM || align=right | 8.8 km || 
|-id=216 bgcolor=#d6d6d6
| 32216 ||  || — || July 23, 2000 || Socorro || LINEAR || EOS || align=right | 7.8 km || 
|-id=217 bgcolor=#E9E9E9
| 32217 Beverlyge ||  ||  || July 23, 2000 || Socorro || LINEAR || — || align=right | 5.4 km || 
|-id=218 bgcolor=#E9E9E9
| 32218 ||  || — || July 23, 2000 || Socorro || LINEAR || MAR || align=right | 5.3 km || 
|-id=219 bgcolor=#E9E9E9
| 32219 ||  || — || July 31, 2000 || Socorro || LINEAR || — || align=right | 7.1 km || 
|-id=220 bgcolor=#E9E9E9
| 32220 ||  || — || July 23, 2000 || Socorro || LINEAR || GAL || align=right | 6.4 km || 
|-id=221 bgcolor=#E9E9E9
| 32221 ||  || — || July 23, 2000 || Socorro || LINEAR || MAR || align=right | 5.9 km || 
|-id=222 bgcolor=#E9E9E9
| 32222 Charlesvest ||  ||  || July 23, 2000 || Socorro || LINEAR || — || align=right | 14 km || 
|-id=223 bgcolor=#fefefe
| 32223 ||  || — || July 23, 2000 || Socorro || LINEAR || — || align=right | 3.7 km || 
|-id=224 bgcolor=#E9E9E9
| 32224 ||  || — || July 23, 2000 || Socorro || LINEAR || — || align=right | 6.7 km || 
|-id=225 bgcolor=#d6d6d6
| 32225 ||  || — || July 23, 2000 || Socorro || LINEAR || THM || align=right | 7.9 km || 
|-id=226 bgcolor=#fefefe
| 32226 Vikulgupta ||  ||  || July 23, 2000 || Socorro || LINEAR || FLO || align=right | 3.8 km || 
|-id=227 bgcolor=#E9E9E9
| 32227 ||  || — || July 23, 2000 || Socorro || LINEAR || — || align=right | 5.0 km || 
|-id=228 bgcolor=#E9E9E9
| 32228 ||  || — || July 23, 2000 || Socorro || LINEAR || — || align=right | 4.8 km || 
|-id=229 bgcolor=#E9E9E9
| 32229 Higashino ||  ||  || July 23, 2000 || Socorro || LINEAR || — || align=right | 3.5 km || 
|-id=230 bgcolor=#d6d6d6
| 32230 ||  || — || July 23, 2000 || Socorro || LINEAR || — || align=right | 12 km || 
|-id=231 bgcolor=#d6d6d6
| 32231 ||  || — || July 23, 2000 || Socorro || LINEAR || — || align=right | 11 km || 
|-id=232 bgcolor=#fefefe
| 32232 ||  || — || July 23, 2000 || Socorro || LINEAR || V || align=right | 4.7 km || 
|-id=233 bgcolor=#d6d6d6
| 32233 Georgehou ||  ||  || July 30, 2000 || Socorro || LINEAR || EOS || align=right | 5.3 km || 
|-id=234 bgcolor=#fefefe
| 32234 Jesslihuang ||  ||  || July 30, 2000 || Socorro || LINEAR || FLO || align=right | 2.7 km || 
|-id=235 bgcolor=#d6d6d6
| 32235 ||  || — || July 30, 2000 || Socorro || LINEAR || — || align=right | 7.6 km || 
|-id=236 bgcolor=#d6d6d6
| 32236 ||  || — || July 30, 2000 || Socorro || LINEAR || EOS || align=right | 5.3 km || 
|-id=237 bgcolor=#d6d6d6
| 32237 Jagadeesan ||  ||  || July 30, 2000 || Socorro || LINEAR || EOS || align=right | 4.9 km || 
|-id=238 bgcolor=#d6d6d6
| 32238 ||  || — || July 30, 2000 || Socorro || LINEAR || — || align=right | 9.1 km || 
|-id=239 bgcolor=#E9E9E9
| 32239 ||  || — || July 30, 2000 || Socorro || LINEAR || — || align=right | 8.6 km || 
|-id=240 bgcolor=#d6d6d6
| 32240 ||  || — || July 30, 2000 || Socorro || LINEAR || ALA || align=right | 19 km || 
|-id=241 bgcolor=#fefefe
| 32241 ||  || — || July 30, 2000 || Socorro || LINEAR || — || align=right | 4.3 km || 
|-id=242 bgcolor=#fefefe
| 32242 Jagota ||  ||  || July 30, 2000 || Socorro || LINEAR || — || align=right | 2.4 km || 
|-id=243 bgcolor=#d6d6d6
| 32243 ||  || — || July 30, 2000 || Socorro || LINEAR || EOS || align=right | 7.4 km || 
|-id=244 bgcolor=#d6d6d6
| 32244 ||  || — || July 30, 2000 || Socorro || LINEAR || URS || align=right | 15 km || 
|-id=245 bgcolor=#d6d6d6
| 32245 ||  || — || July 30, 2000 || Socorro || LINEAR || — || align=right | 7.5 km || 
|-id=246 bgcolor=#d6d6d6
| 32246 ||  || — || July 30, 2000 || Socorro || LINEAR || — || align=right | 8.6 km || 
|-id=247 bgcolor=#E9E9E9
| 32247 ||  || — || July 30, 2000 || Socorro || LINEAR || MRX || align=right | 4.6 km || 
|-id=248 bgcolor=#E9E9E9
| 32248 ||  || — || July 30, 2000 || Socorro || LINEAR || EUN || align=right | 7.6 km || 
|-id=249 bgcolor=#d6d6d6
| 32249 ||  || — || July 30, 2000 || Socorro || LINEAR || — || align=right | 7.5 km || 
|-id=250 bgcolor=#d6d6d6
| 32250 Karthik ||  ||  || July 30, 2000 || Socorro || LINEAR || EOS || align=right | 6.2 km || 
|-id=251 bgcolor=#E9E9E9
| 32251 ||  || — || July 31, 2000 || Socorro || LINEAR || — || align=right | 7.8 km || 
|-id=252 bgcolor=#E9E9E9
| 32252 ||  || — || July 30, 2000 || Socorro || LINEAR || — || align=right | 5.6 km || 
|-id=253 bgcolor=#d6d6d6
| 32253 ||  || — || July 30, 2000 || Socorro || LINEAR || ALA || align=right | 26 km || 
|-id=254 bgcolor=#d6d6d6
| 32254 ||  || — || July 30, 2000 || Socorro || LINEAR || — || align=right | 17 km || 
|-id=255 bgcolor=#E9E9E9
| 32255 ||  || — || July 30, 2000 || Socorro || LINEAR || ADE || align=right | 5.6 km || 
|-id=256 bgcolor=#E9E9E9
| 32256 ||  || — || July 30, 2000 || Socorro || LINEAR || MAR || align=right | 4.8 km || 
|-id=257 bgcolor=#d6d6d6
| 32257 ||  || — || July 31, 2000 || Socorro || LINEAR || EOS || align=right | 8.7 km || 
|-id=258 bgcolor=#d6d6d6
| 32258 ||  || — || July 30, 2000 || Socorro || LINEAR || — || align=right | 6.2 km || 
|-id=259 bgcolor=#d6d6d6
| 32259 ||  || — || July 30, 2000 || Socorro || LINEAR || — || align=right | 13 km || 
|-id=260 bgcolor=#d6d6d6
| 32260 Schult ||  ||  || July 29, 2000 || Anderson Mesa || LONEOS || EOS || align=right | 5.6 km || 
|-id=261 bgcolor=#d6d6d6
| 32261 ||  || — || July 29, 2000 || Anderson Mesa || LONEOS || — || align=right | 5.6 km || 
|-id=262 bgcolor=#E9E9E9
| 32262 ||  || — || July 29, 2000 || Anderson Mesa || LONEOS || — || align=right | 2.5 km || 
|-id=263 bgcolor=#E9E9E9
| 32263 Kusnierkiewicz ||  ||  || July 31, 2000 || Cerro Tololo || M. W. Buie || — || align=right | 3.9 km || 
|-id=264 bgcolor=#E9E9E9
| 32264 Cathjesslai ||  ||  || August 1, 2000 || Socorro || LINEAR || — || align=right | 2.5 km || 
|-id=265 bgcolor=#E9E9E9
| 32265 ||  || — || August 1, 2000 || Socorro || LINEAR || DOR || align=right | 12 km || 
|-id=266 bgcolor=#d6d6d6
| 32266 ||  || — || August 1, 2000 || Socorro || LINEAR || — || align=right | 6.6 km || 
|-id=267 bgcolor=#E9E9E9
| 32267 Hermannweyl ||  ||  || August 1, 2000 || Prescott || P. G. Comba || — || align=right | 3.9 km || 
|-id=268 bgcolor=#d6d6d6
| 32268 ||  || — || August 1, 2000 || Socorro || LINEAR || VER || align=right | 7.6 km || 
|-id=269 bgcolor=#d6d6d6
| 32269 ||  || — || August 1, 2000 || Socorro || LINEAR || — || align=right | 7.1 km || 
|-id=270 bgcolor=#E9E9E9
| 32270 Inokuchihiroo ||  ||  || August 4, 2000 || Bisei SG Center || BATTeRS || — || align=right | 6.4 km || 
|-id=271 bgcolor=#d6d6d6
| 32271 ||  || — || August 1, 2000 || Socorro || LINEAR || EOS || align=right | 4.8 km || 
|-id=272 bgcolor=#fefefe
| 32272 Hasegawayuya ||  ||  || August 4, 2000 || Bisei SG Center || BATTeRS || V || align=right | 2.4 km || 
|-id=273 bgcolor=#d6d6d6
| 32273 ||  || — || August 5, 2000 || Haleakala || NEAT || EOS || align=right | 4.6 km || 
|-id=274 bgcolor=#d6d6d6
| 32274 ||  || — || August 1, 2000 || Socorro || LINEAR || EOS || align=right | 6.6 km || 
|-id=275 bgcolor=#E9E9E9
| 32275 Limichael ||  ||  || August 1, 2000 || Socorro || LINEAR || — || align=right | 2.9 km || 
|-id=276 bgcolor=#fefefe
| 32276 Allenliu ||  ||  || August 1, 2000 || Socorro || LINEAR || V || align=right | 2.1 km || 
|-id=277 bgcolor=#E9E9E9
| 32277 Helenliu ||  ||  || August 1, 2000 || Socorro || LINEAR || — || align=right | 5.1 km || 
|-id=278 bgcolor=#E9E9E9
| 32278 Makaram ||  ||  || August 1, 2000 || Socorro || LINEAR || HEN || align=right | 4.1 km || 
|-id=279 bgcolor=#E9E9E9
| 32279 Marshall ||  ||  || August 1, 2000 || Socorro || LINEAR || — || align=right | 4.6 km || 
|-id=280 bgcolor=#d6d6d6
| 32280 Rachelmashal ||  ||  || August 1, 2000 || Socorro || LINEAR || KOR || align=right | 4.2 km || 
|-id=281 bgcolor=#d6d6d6
| 32281 Shreyamenon ||  ||  || August 1, 2000 || Socorro || LINEAR || — || align=right | 5.6 km || 
|-id=282 bgcolor=#d6d6d6
| 32282 Arnoldmong ||  ||  || August 2, 2000 || Socorro || LINEAR || THM || align=right | 7.9 km || 
|-id=283 bgcolor=#E9E9E9
| 32283 ||  || — || August 2, 2000 || Socorro || LINEAR || — || align=right | 9.4 km || 
|-id=284 bgcolor=#d6d6d6
| 32284 ||  || — || August 2, 2000 || Socorro || LINEAR || — || align=right | 4.8 km || 
|-id=285 bgcolor=#E9E9E9
| 32285 ||  || — || August 3, 2000 || Socorro || LINEAR || MAR || align=right | 4.3 km || 
|-id=286 bgcolor=#d6d6d6
| 32286 ||  || — || August 3, 2000 || Socorro || LINEAR || — || align=right | 11 km || 
|-id=287 bgcolor=#fefefe
| 32287 ||  || — || August 5, 2000 || Haleakala || NEAT || — || align=right | 5.4 km || 
|-id=288 bgcolor=#E9E9E9
| 32288 Terui ||  ||  || August 23, 2000 || Bisei SG Center || BATTeRS || — || align=right | 6.5 km || 
|-id=289 bgcolor=#d6d6d6
| 32289 ||  || — || August 24, 2000 || Socorro || LINEAR || EOS || align=right | 6.3 km || 
|-id=290 bgcolor=#fefefe
| 32290 ||  || — || August 24, 2000 || Socorro || LINEAR || — || align=right | 6.9 km || 
|-id=291 bgcolor=#E9E9E9
| 32291 ||  || — || August 24, 2000 || Črni Vrh || Črni Vrh || — || align=right | 6.5 km || 
|-id=292 bgcolor=#d6d6d6
| 32292 ||  || — || August 24, 2000 || Črni Vrh || Črni Vrh || — || align=right | 3.6 km || 
|-id=293 bgcolor=#d6d6d6
| 32293 ||  || — || August 24, 2000 || Črni Vrh || Črni Vrh || EOS || align=right | 5.0 km || 
|-id=294 bgcolor=#E9E9E9
| 32294 Zajonc ||  ||  || August 26, 2000 || Ondřejov || P. Kušnirák, P. Pravec || EUN || align=right | 4.1 km || 
|-id=295 bgcolor=#E9E9E9
| 32295 Ravichandran ||  ||  || August 24, 2000 || Socorro || LINEAR || — || align=right | 3.4 km || 
|-id=296 bgcolor=#d6d6d6
| 32296 Aninsayana ||  ||  || August 24, 2000 || Socorro || LINEAR || — || align=right | 7.1 km || 
|-id=297 bgcolor=#E9E9E9
| 32297 ||  || — || August 24, 2000 || Socorro || LINEAR || MAR || align=right | 3.2 km || 
|-id=298 bgcolor=#d6d6d6
| 32298 Kunalshroff ||  ||  || August 24, 2000 || Socorro || LINEAR || KOR || align=right | 4.3 km || 
|-id=299 bgcolor=#E9E9E9
| 32299 Srinivas ||  ||  || August 24, 2000 || Socorro || LINEAR || — || align=right | 6.9 km || 
|-id=300 bgcolor=#d6d6d6
| 32300 Uwamanzunna ||  ||  || August 24, 2000 || Socorro || LINEAR || — || align=right | 6.7 km || 
|}

32301–32400 

|-bgcolor=#d6d6d6
| 32301 ||  || — || August 25, 2000 || Socorro || LINEAR || — || align=right | 6.8 km || 
|-id=302 bgcolor=#fefefe
| 32302 Mayavarma ||  ||  || August 25, 2000 || Socorro || LINEAR || FLO || align=right | 2.1 km || 
|-id=303 bgcolor=#d6d6d6
| 32303 ||  || — || August 25, 2000 || Socorro || LINEAR || — || align=right | 14 km || 
|-id=304 bgcolor=#E9E9E9
| 32304 ||  || — || August 25, 2000 || Farpoint || Farpoint Obs. || MAR || align=right | 4.0 km || 
|-id=305 bgcolor=#d6d6d6
| 32305 ||  || — || August 24, 2000 || Socorro || LINEAR || EOS || align=right | 9.8 km || 
|-id=306 bgcolor=#d6d6d6
| 32306 ||  || — || August 24, 2000 || Socorro || LINEAR || KOR || align=right | 4.9 km || 
|-id=307 bgcolor=#d6d6d6
| 32307 ||  || — || August 26, 2000 || Socorro || LINEAR || — || align=right | 8.4 km || 
|-id=308 bgcolor=#E9E9E9
| 32308 Sreyavemuri ||  ||  || August 26, 2000 || Socorro || LINEAR || — || align=right | 4.0 km || 
|-id=309 bgcolor=#E9E9E9
| 32309 ||  || — || August 26, 2000 || Socorro || LINEAR || — || align=right | 4.8 km || 
|-id=310 bgcolor=#E9E9E9
| 32310 Asherwillner ||  ||  || August 24, 2000 || Socorro || LINEAR || — || align=right | 3.4 km || 
|-id=311 bgcolor=#E9E9E9
| 32311 Josephineyu ||  ||  || August 24, 2000 || Socorro || LINEAR || — || align=right | 3.8 km || 
|-id=312 bgcolor=#d6d6d6
| 32312 ||  || — || August 24, 2000 || Socorro || LINEAR || — || align=right | 5.6 km || 
|-id=313 bgcolor=#d6d6d6
| 32313 Zhangmichael ||  ||  || August 24, 2000 || Socorro || LINEAR || — || align=right | 7.6 km || 
|-id=314 bgcolor=#d6d6d6
| 32314 Rachelzhang ||  ||  || August 24, 2000 || Socorro || LINEAR || KOR || align=right | 3.9 km || 
|-id=315 bgcolor=#d6d6d6
| 32315 Clarezhu ||  ||  || August 24, 2000 || Socorro || LINEAR || KOR || align=right | 3.4 km || 
|-id=316 bgcolor=#d6d6d6
| 32316 ||  || — || August 24, 2000 || Socorro || LINEAR || — || align=right | 5.2 km || 
|-id=317 bgcolor=#d6d6d6
| 32317 ||  || — || August 24, 2000 || Socorro || LINEAR || — || align=right | 4.6 km || 
|-id=318 bgcolor=#d6d6d6
| 32318 ||  || — || August 24, 2000 || Socorro || LINEAR || KOR || align=right | 3.1 km || 
|-id=319 bgcolor=#fefefe
| 32319 ||  || — || August 24, 2000 || Socorro || LINEAR || — || align=right | 3.2 km || 
|-id=320 bgcolor=#d6d6d6
| 32320 ||  || — || August 24, 2000 || Socorro || LINEAR || EOS || align=right | 5.2 km || 
|-id=321 bgcolor=#E9E9E9
| 32321 ||  || — || August 25, 2000 || Socorro || LINEAR || — || align=right | 3.7 km || 
|-id=322 bgcolor=#E9E9E9
| 32322 ||  || — || August 26, 2000 || Socorro || LINEAR || — || align=right | 3.2 km || 
|-id=323 bgcolor=#d6d6d6
| 32323 ||  || — || August 26, 2000 || Socorro || LINEAR || KOR || align=right | 3.7 km || 
|-id=324 bgcolor=#d6d6d6
| 32324 ||  || — || August 26, 2000 || Socorro || LINEAR || EOS || align=right | 5.6 km || 
|-id=325 bgcolor=#d6d6d6
| 32325 ||  || — || August 28, 2000 || Socorro || LINEAR || — || align=right | 11 km || 
|-id=326 bgcolor=#E9E9E9
| 32326 ||  || — || August 28, 2000 || Socorro || LINEAR || JUN || align=right | 4.7 km || 
|-id=327 bgcolor=#d6d6d6
| 32327 ||  || — || August 28, 2000 || Socorro || LINEAR || — || align=right | 6.7 km || 
|-id=328 bgcolor=#E9E9E9
| 32328 ||  || — || August 28, 2000 || Socorro || LINEAR || — || align=right | 4.1 km || 
|-id=329 bgcolor=#d6d6d6
| 32329 ||  || — || August 28, 2000 || Socorro || LINEAR || — || align=right | 5.1 km || 
|-id=330 bgcolor=#d6d6d6
| 32330 ||  || — || August 28, 2000 || Socorro || LINEAR || — || align=right | 9.5 km || 
|-id=331 bgcolor=#d6d6d6
| 32331 ||  || — || August 28, 2000 || Socorro || LINEAR || — || align=right | 14 km || 
|-id=332 bgcolor=#d6d6d6
| 32332 ||  || — || August 30, 2000 || Kitt Peak || Spacewatch || 7:4 || align=right | 9.5 km || 
|-id=333 bgcolor=#d6d6d6
| 32333 ||  || — || August 24, 2000 || Socorro || LINEAR || — || align=right | 8.5 km || 
|-id=334 bgcolor=#d6d6d6
| 32334 ||  || — || August 24, 2000 || Socorro || LINEAR || THM || align=right | 6.6 km || 
|-id=335 bgcolor=#d6d6d6
| 32335 ||  || — || August 24, 2000 || Socorro || LINEAR || — || align=right | 8.5 km || 
|-id=336 bgcolor=#E9E9E9
| 32336 ||  || — || August 25, 2000 || Socorro || LINEAR || — || align=right | 8.6 km || 
|-id=337 bgcolor=#d6d6d6
| 32337 ||  || — || August 25, 2000 || Socorro || LINEAR || HYG || align=right | 6.0 km || 
|-id=338 bgcolor=#d6d6d6
| 32338 ||  || — || August 25, 2000 || Socorro || LINEAR || ALA || align=right | 12 km || 
|-id=339 bgcolor=#C2FFFF
| 32339 ||  || — || August 25, 2000 || Socorro || LINEAR || L5 || align=right | 28 km || 
|-id=340 bgcolor=#E9E9E9
| 32340 ||  || — || August 25, 2000 || Socorro || LINEAR || — || align=right | 6.0 km || 
|-id=341 bgcolor=#fefefe
| 32341 ||  || — || August 25, 2000 || Socorro || LINEAR || V || align=right | 1.8 km || 
|-id=342 bgcolor=#fefefe
| 32342 ||  || — || August 25, 2000 || Socorro || LINEAR || FLO || align=right | 3.2 km || 
|-id=343 bgcolor=#E9E9E9
| 32343 ||  || — || August 25, 2000 || Socorro || LINEAR || GEF || align=right | 5.1 km || 
|-id=344 bgcolor=#d6d6d6
| 32344 ||  || — || August 26, 2000 || Socorro || LINEAR || EOS || align=right | 4.7 km || 
|-id=345 bgcolor=#d6d6d6
| 32345 ||  || — || August 28, 2000 || Socorro || LINEAR || 7:4 || align=right | 9.6 km || 
|-id=346 bgcolor=#E9E9E9
| 32346 ||  || — || August 28, 2000 || Socorro || LINEAR || — || align=right | 4.8 km || 
|-id=347 bgcolor=#d6d6d6
| 32347 ||  || — || August 28, 2000 || Socorro || LINEAR || EOS || align=right | 6.0 km || 
|-id=348 bgcolor=#E9E9E9
| 32348 ||  || — || August 28, 2000 || Socorro || LINEAR || — || align=right | 14 km || 
|-id=349 bgcolor=#E9E9E9
| 32349 ||  || — || August 29, 2000 || Socorro || LINEAR || — || align=right | 4.1 km || 
|-id=350 bgcolor=#d6d6d6
| 32350 ||  || — || August 25, 2000 || Socorro || LINEAR || EOS || align=right | 5.9 km || 
|-id=351 bgcolor=#d6d6d6
| 32351 ||  || — || August 28, 2000 || Socorro || LINEAR || THM || align=right | 8.3 km || 
|-id=352 bgcolor=#d6d6d6
| 32352 ||  || — || August 28, 2000 || Socorro || LINEAR || — || align=right | 4.2 km || 
|-id=353 bgcolor=#d6d6d6
| 32353 ||  || — || August 25, 2000 || Socorro || LINEAR || — || align=right | 10 km || 
|-id=354 bgcolor=#d6d6d6
| 32354 ||  || — || August 25, 2000 || Socorro || LINEAR || — || align=right | 9.0 km || 
|-id=355 bgcolor=#E9E9E9
| 32355 ||  || — || August 25, 2000 || Socorro || LINEAR || EUN || align=right | 6.0 km || 
|-id=356 bgcolor=#C2FFFF
| 32356 ||  || — || August 28, 2000 || Socorro || LINEAR || L5 || align=right | 15 km || 
|-id=357 bgcolor=#fefefe
| 32357 ||  || — || August 29, 2000 || Socorro || LINEAR || — || align=right | 3.4 km || 
|-id=358 bgcolor=#d6d6d6
| 32358 ||  || — || August 29, 2000 || Socorro || LINEAR || — || align=right | 6.9 km || 
|-id=359 bgcolor=#E9E9E9
| 32359 ||  || — || August 25, 2000 || Socorro || LINEAR || — || align=right | 4.4 km || 
|-id=360 bgcolor=#d6d6d6
| 32360 ||  || — || August 26, 2000 || Socorro || LINEAR || THM || align=right | 7.5 km || 
|-id=361 bgcolor=#d6d6d6
| 32361 ||  || — || August 26, 2000 || Socorro || LINEAR || — || align=right | 13 km || 
|-id=362 bgcolor=#d6d6d6
| 32362 ||  || — || August 29, 2000 || Socorro || LINEAR || EOS || align=right | 4.4 km || 
|-id=363 bgcolor=#E9E9E9
| 32363 ||  || — || August 29, 2000 || Socorro || LINEAR || — || align=right | 4.2 km || 
|-id=364 bgcolor=#d6d6d6
| 32364 ||  || — || August 31, 2000 || Socorro || LINEAR || HYG || align=right | 7.6 km || 
|-id=365 bgcolor=#d6d6d6
| 32365 ||  || — || August 31, 2000 || Socorro || LINEAR || — || align=right | 8.3 km || 
|-id=366 bgcolor=#fefefe
| 32366 ||  || — || August 31, 2000 || Socorro || LINEAR || — || align=right | 3.3 km || 
|-id=367 bgcolor=#d6d6d6
| 32367 ||  || — || August 31, 2000 || Socorro || LINEAR || — || align=right | 6.0 km || 
|-id=368 bgcolor=#d6d6d6
| 32368 ||  || — || August 31, 2000 || Socorro || LINEAR || EOS || align=right | 5.5 km || 
|-id=369 bgcolor=#d6d6d6
| 32369 ||  || — || August 24, 2000 || Socorro || LINEAR || — || align=right | 8.4 km || 
|-id=370 bgcolor=#C2FFFF
| 32370 ||  || — || August 26, 2000 || Socorro || LINEAR || L5 || align=right | 18 km || 
|-id=371 bgcolor=#E9E9E9
| 32371 ||  || — || August 31, 2000 || Socorro || LINEAR || GEF || align=right | 4.2 km || 
|-id=372 bgcolor=#d6d6d6
| 32372 ||  || — || August 31, 2000 || Socorro || LINEAR || EOS || align=right | 4.6 km || 
|-id=373 bgcolor=#d6d6d6
| 32373 ||  || — || August 31, 2000 || Socorro || LINEAR || — || align=right | 8.8 km || 
|-id=374 bgcolor=#d6d6d6
| 32374 ||  || — || August 31, 2000 || Socorro || LINEAR || — || align=right | 9.7 km || 
|-id=375 bgcolor=#d6d6d6
| 32375 ||  || — || August 31, 2000 || Socorro || LINEAR || EOS || align=right | 4.7 km || 
|-id=376 bgcolor=#E9E9E9
| 32376 ||  || — || August 31, 2000 || Socorro || LINEAR || MAR || align=right | 5.4 km || 
|-id=377 bgcolor=#d6d6d6
| 32377 ||  || — || August 31, 2000 || Socorro || LINEAR || — || align=right | 8.2 km || 
|-id=378 bgcolor=#E9E9E9
| 32378 ||  || — || August 31, 2000 || Socorro || LINEAR || — || align=right | 3.6 km || 
|-id=379 bgcolor=#E9E9E9
| 32379 Markadame ||  ||  || August 31, 2000 || Socorro || LINEAR || MRX || align=right | 2.6 km || 
|-id=380 bgcolor=#d6d6d6
| 32380 ||  || — || August 26, 2000 || Socorro || LINEAR || — || align=right | 6.1 km || 
|-id=381 bgcolor=#E9E9E9
| 32381 Bellomo ||  ||  || August 26, 2000 || Socorro || LINEAR || — || align=right | 7.1 km || 
|-id=382 bgcolor=#d6d6d6
| 32382 ||  || — || August 26, 2000 || Socorro || LINEAR || — || align=right | 5.6 km || 
|-id=383 bgcolor=#E9E9E9
| 32383 ||  || — || August 26, 2000 || Socorro || LINEAR || — || align=right | 4.9 km || 
|-id=384 bgcolor=#E9E9E9
| 32384 Scottbest ||  ||  || August 26, 2000 || Socorro || LINEAR || — || align=right | 8.0 km || 
|-id=385 bgcolor=#E9E9E9
| 32385 ||  || — || August 26, 2000 || Socorro || LINEAR || CLO || align=right | 7.1 km || 
|-id=386 bgcolor=#d6d6d6
| 32386 ||  || — || August 26, 2000 || Socorro || LINEAR || — || align=right | 9.4 km || 
|-id=387 bgcolor=#d6d6d6
| 32387 D'Egidio ||  ||  || August 29, 2000 || Socorro || LINEAR || — || align=right | 7.1 km || 
|-id=388 bgcolor=#d6d6d6
| 32388 ||  || — || August 29, 2000 || Socorro || LINEAR || — || align=right | 5.7 km || 
|-id=389 bgcolor=#d6d6d6
| 32389 Michflannory ||  ||  || August 29, 2000 || Socorro || LINEAR || THM || align=right | 6.8 km || 
|-id=390 bgcolor=#E9E9E9
| 32390 ||  || — || August 29, 2000 || Socorro || LINEAR || — || align=right | 5.7 km || 
|-id=391 bgcolor=#d6d6d6
| 32391 ||  || — || August 29, 2000 || Socorro || LINEAR || HYG || align=right | 8.7 km || 
|-id=392 bgcolor=#d6d6d6
| 32392 ||  || — || August 31, 2000 || Socorro || LINEAR || EOS || align=right | 7.5 km || 
|-id=393 bgcolor=#d6d6d6
| 32393 Galinato ||  ||  || August 31, 2000 || Socorro || LINEAR || — || align=right | 6.9 km || 
|-id=394 bgcolor=#d6d6d6
| 32394 ||  || — || August 31, 2000 || Socorro || LINEAR || SYL7:4 || align=right | 11 km || 
|-id=395 bgcolor=#d6d6d6
| 32395 ||  || — || August 31, 2000 || Socorro || LINEAR || 3:2 || align=right | 18 km || 
|-id=396 bgcolor=#C2FFFF
| 32396 ||  || — || August 31, 2000 || Socorro || LINEAR || L5 || align=right | 20 km || 
|-id=397 bgcolor=#C2FFFF
| 32397 ||  || — || August 31, 2000 || Socorro || LINEAR || L5 || align=right | 31 km || 
|-id=398 bgcolor=#d6d6d6
| 32398 ||  || — || August 20, 2000 || Anderson Mesa || LONEOS || HYG || align=right | 7.5 km || 
|-id=399 bgcolor=#d6d6d6
| 32399 ||  || — || August 20, 2000 || Anderson Mesa || LONEOS || KOR || align=right | 3.8 km || 
|-id=400 bgcolor=#d6d6d6
| 32400 Itaparica ||  ||  || August 21, 2000 || Anderson Mesa || LONEOS || EOS || align=right | 7.0 km || 
|}

32401–32500 

|-bgcolor=#d6d6d6
| 32401 ||  || — || August 31, 2000 || Kitt Peak || Spacewatch || — || align=right | 8.8 km || 
|-id=402 bgcolor=#E9E9E9
| 32402 ||  || — || August 20, 2000 || Anderson Mesa || LONEOS || DOR || align=right | 11 km || 
|-id=403 bgcolor=#d6d6d6
| 32403 ||  || — || August 28, 2000 || Socorro || LINEAR || — || align=right | 8.7 km || 
|-id=404 bgcolor=#E9E9E9
| 32404 || 2000 RN || — || September 1, 2000 || Socorro || LINEAR || — || align=right | 5.0 km || 
|-id=405 bgcolor=#fefefe
| 32405 Jameshill ||  ||  || September 1, 2000 || Socorro || LINEAR || V || align=right | 2.7 km || 
|-id=406 bgcolor=#E9E9E9
| 32406 Tracyhughes ||  ||  || September 1, 2000 || Socorro || LINEAR || — || align=right | 8.6 km || 
|-id=407 bgcolor=#d6d6d6
| 32407 ||  || — || September 1, 2000 || Socorro || LINEAR || KOR || align=right | 5.2 km || 
|-id=408 bgcolor=#d6d6d6
| 32408 ||  || — || September 1, 2000 || Socorro || LINEAR || — || align=right | 4.1 km || 
|-id=409 bgcolor=#E9E9E9
| 32409 ||  || — || September 1, 2000 || Socorro || LINEAR || — || align=right | 5.9 km || 
|-id=410 bgcolor=#d6d6d6
| 32410 ||  || — || September 1, 2000 || Socorro || LINEAR || EOS || align=right | 4.9 km || 
|-id=411 bgcolor=#d6d6d6
| 32411 ||  || — || September 1, 2000 || Socorro || LINEAR || URS || align=right | 8.2 km || 
|-id=412 bgcolor=#d6d6d6
| 32412 ||  || — || September 1, 2000 || Socorro || LINEAR || EOS || align=right | 8.8 km || 
|-id=413 bgcolor=#d6d6d6
| 32413 ||  || — || September 1, 2000 || Socorro || LINEAR || EOS || align=right | 6.9 km || 
|-id=414 bgcolor=#d6d6d6
| 32414 ||  || — || September 1, 2000 || Socorro || LINEAR || EOS || align=right | 7.4 km || 
|-id=415 bgcolor=#d6d6d6
| 32415 ||  || — || September 1, 2000 || Socorro || LINEAR || EOS || align=right | 4.8 km || 
|-id=416 bgcolor=#d6d6d6
| 32416 ||  || — || September 1, 2000 || Socorro || LINEAR || VER || align=right | 13 km || 
|-id=417 bgcolor=#d6d6d6
| 32417 ||  || — || September 1, 2000 || Socorro || LINEAR || EOS || align=right | 5.3 km || 
|-id=418 bgcolor=#E9E9E9
| 32418 ||  || — || September 1, 2000 || Socorro || LINEAR || CLO || align=right | 8.7 km || 
|-id=419 bgcolor=#E9E9E9
| 32419 ||  || — || September 1, 2000 || Socorro || LINEAR || RAF || align=right | 5.5 km || 
|-id=420 bgcolor=#C2FFFF
| 32420 ||  || — || September 3, 2000 || Socorro || LINEAR || L5 || align=right | 20 km || 
|-id=421 bgcolor=#d6d6d6
| 32421 ||  || — || September 3, 2000 || Socorro || LINEAR || — || align=right | 8.5 km || 
|-id=422 bgcolor=#d6d6d6
| 32422 ||  || — || September 3, 2000 || Socorro || LINEAR || EOS || align=right | 6.3 km || 
|-id=423 bgcolor=#d6d6d6
| 32423 ||  || — || September 3, 2000 || Socorro || LINEAR || — || align=right | 8.1 km || 
|-id=424 bgcolor=#fefefe
| 32424 Caryjames ||  ||  || September 2, 2000 || Socorro || LINEAR || — || align=right | 3.1 km || 
|-id=425 bgcolor=#E9E9E9
| 32425 ||  || — || September 1, 2000 || Socorro || LINEAR || — || align=right | 7.3 km || 
|-id=426 bgcolor=#E9E9E9
| 32426 ||  || — || September 2, 2000 || Socorro || LINEAR || — || align=right | 3.8 km || 
|-id=427 bgcolor=#d6d6d6
| 32427 ||  || — || September 2, 2000 || Socorro || LINEAR || — || align=right | 7.0 km || 
|-id=428 bgcolor=#fefefe
| 32428 Peterlangley ||  ||  || September 3, 2000 || Socorro || LINEAR || — || align=right | 2.2 km || 
|-id=429 bgcolor=#d6d6d6
| 32429 ||  || — || September 1, 2000 || Socorro || LINEAR || — || align=right | 10 km || 
|-id=430 bgcolor=#C2FFFF
| 32430 ||  || — || September 1, 2000 || Socorro || LINEAR || L5 || align=right | 13 km || 
|-id=431 bgcolor=#d6d6d6
| 32431 ||  || — || September 2, 2000 || Anderson Mesa || LONEOS || EOS || align=right | 9.7 km || 
|-id=432 bgcolor=#d6d6d6
| 32432 ||  || — || September 2, 2000 || Anderson Mesa || LONEOS || HYG || align=right | 9.6 km || 
|-id=433 bgcolor=#d6d6d6
| 32433 ||  || — || September 3, 2000 || Socorro || LINEAR || 7:4 || align=right | 14 km || 
|-id=434 bgcolor=#C2FFFF
| 32434 ||  || — || September 5, 2000 || Anderson Mesa || LONEOS || L5 || align=right | 21 km || 
|-id=435 bgcolor=#C2FFFF
| 32435 ||  || — || September 5, 2000 || Anderson Mesa || LONEOS || L5 || align=right | 31 km || 
|-id=436 bgcolor=#E9E9E9
| 32436 Eranofek ||  ||  || September 5, 2000 || Anderson Mesa || LONEOS || HNS || align=right | 5.9 km || 
|-id=437 bgcolor=#C2FFFF
| 32437 ||  || — || September 5, 2000 || Anderson Mesa || LONEOS || L5 || align=right | 29 km || 
|-id=438 bgcolor=#d6d6d6
| 32438 ||  || — || September 5, 2000 || Anderson Mesa || LONEOS || — || align=right | 11 km || 
|-id=439 bgcolor=#d6d6d6
| 32439 ||  || — || September 5, 2000 || Anderson Mesa || LONEOS || — || align=right | 9.0 km || 
|-id=440 bgcolor=#C2FFFF
| 32440 ||  || — || September 5, 2000 || Anderson Mesa || LONEOS || L5 || align=right | 29 km || 
|-id=441 bgcolor=#E9E9E9
| 32441 ||  || — || September 5, 2000 || Anderson Mesa || LONEOS || — || align=right | 14 km || 
|-id=442 bgcolor=#d6d6d6
| 32442 ||  || — || September 5, 2000 || Anderson Mesa || LONEOS || — || align=right | 16 km || 
|-id=443 bgcolor=#E9E9E9
| 32443 ||  || — || September 5, 2000 || Anderson Mesa || LONEOS || — || align=right | 4.6 km || 
|-id=444 bgcolor=#d6d6d6
| 32444 ||  || — || September 5, 2000 || Anderson Mesa || LONEOS || — || align=right | 11 km || 
|-id=445 bgcolor=#E9E9E9
| 32445 ||  || — || September 6, 2000 || Socorro || LINEAR || ADE || align=right | 11 km || 
|-id=446 bgcolor=#E9E9E9
| 32446 ||  || — || September 20, 2000 || Socorro || LINEAR || ADE || align=right | 4.3 km || 
|-id=447 bgcolor=#d6d6d6
| 32447 ||  || — || September 20, 2000 || Socorro || LINEAR || — || align=right | 8.0 km || 
|-id=448 bgcolor=#d6d6d6
| 32448 ||  || — || September 20, 2000 || Socorro || LINEAR || — || align=right | 6.9 km || 
|-id=449 bgcolor=#fefefe
| 32449 Crystalmiller ||  ||  || September 23, 2000 || Socorro || LINEAR || — || align=right | 2.4 km || 
|-id=450 bgcolor=#d6d6d6
| 32450 ||  || — || September 23, 2000 || Socorro || LINEAR || — || align=right | 7.4 km || 
|-id=451 bgcolor=#C2FFFF
| 32451 ||  || — || September 23, 2000 || Socorro || LINEAR || L5 || align=right | 27 km || 
|-id=452 bgcolor=#E9E9E9
| 32452 ||  || — || September 24, 2000 || Socorro || LINEAR || — || align=right | 8.3 km || 
|-id=453 bgcolor=#d6d6d6
| 32453 Kanamishogo ||  ||  || September 26, 2000 || Fukuchiyama || M. Yoshimi || EOS || align=right | 7.5 km || 
|-id=454 bgcolor=#d6d6d6
| 32454 ||  || — || September 23, 2000 || Socorro || LINEAR || HYG || align=right | 6.7 km || 
|-id=455 bgcolor=#d6d6d6
| 32455 ||  || — || September 24, 2000 || Socorro || LINEAR || HIL3:2 || align=right | 13 km || 
|-id=456 bgcolor=#d6d6d6
| 32456 ||  || — || September 24, 2000 || Socorro || LINEAR || TIR || align=right | 8.1 km || 
|-id=457 bgcolor=#d6d6d6
| 32457 ||  || — || September 24, 2000 || Socorro || LINEAR || — || align=right | 5.4 km || 
|-id=458 bgcolor=#fefefe
| 32458 ||  || — || September 24, 2000 || Socorro || LINEAR || — || align=right | 3.8 km || 
|-id=459 bgcolor=#E9E9E9
| 32459 ||  || — || September 24, 2000 || Socorro || LINEAR || — || align=right | 9.2 km || 
|-id=460 bgcolor=#d6d6d6
| 32460 ||  || — || September 23, 2000 || Socorro || LINEAR || Tj (2.94) || align=right | 20 km || 
|-id=461 bgcolor=#C2FFFF
| 32461 ||  || — || September 23, 2000 || Socorro || LINEAR || L5 || align=right | 23 km || 
|-id=462 bgcolor=#d6d6d6
| 32462 Janmitchener ||  ||  || September 24, 2000 || Socorro || LINEAR || THM || align=right | 7.6 km || 
|-id=463 bgcolor=#d6d6d6
| 32463 ||  || — || September 22, 2000 || Socorro || LINEAR || — || align=right | 9.6 km || 
|-id=464 bgcolor=#C2FFFF
| 32464 ||  || — || September 22, 2000 || Socorro || LINEAR || L5 || align=right | 30 km || 
|-id=465 bgcolor=#d6d6d6
| 32465 ||  || — || September 23, 2000 || Socorro || LINEAR || EOS || align=right | 5.7 km || 
|-id=466 bgcolor=#E9E9E9
| 32466 ||  || — || September 24, 2000 || Socorro || LINEAR || — || align=right | 6.0 km || 
|-id=467 bgcolor=#C2FFFF
| 32467 ||  || — || September 28, 2000 || Socorro || LINEAR || L5 || align=right | 20 km || 
|-id=468 bgcolor=#E9E9E9
| 32468 ||  || — || September 28, 2000 || Socorro || LINEAR || EUN || align=right | 4.9 km || 
|-id=469 bgcolor=#E9E9E9
| 32469 ||  || — || September 21, 2000 || Haleakala || NEAT || — || align=right | 10 km || 
|-id=470 bgcolor=#d6d6d6
| 32470 ||  || — || September 23, 2000 || Kitt Peak || Spacewatch || — || align=right | 7.4 km || 
|-id=471 bgcolor=#C2FFFF
| 32471 ||  || — || September 24, 2000 || Socorro || LINEAR || L5 || align=right | 15 km || 
|-id=472 bgcolor=#d6d6d6
| 32472 ||  || — || September 25, 2000 || Socorro || LINEAR || — || align=right | 5.7 km || 
|-id=473 bgcolor=#E9E9E9
| 32473 ||  || — || September 25, 2000 || Socorro || LINEAR || — || align=right | 4.9 km || 
|-id=474 bgcolor=#d6d6d6
| 32474 ||  || — || September 25, 2000 || Socorro || LINEAR || — || align=right | 13 km || 
|-id=475 bgcolor=#C2FFFF
| 32475 ||  || — || September 21, 2000 || Socorro || LINEAR || L5 || align=right | 38 km || 
|-id=476 bgcolor=#d6d6d6
| 32476 ||  || — || September 25, 2000 || Socorro || LINEAR || — || align=right | 5.9 km || 
|-id=477 bgcolor=#d6d6d6
| 32477 ||  || — || September 26, 2000 || Socorro || LINEAR || — || align=right | 12 km || 
|-id=478 bgcolor=#C2FFFF
| 32478 ||  || — || September 27, 2000 || Socorro || LINEAR || L5 || align=right | 21 km || 
|-id=479 bgcolor=#E9E9E9
| 32479 ||  || — || September 27, 2000 || Socorro || LINEAR || — || align=right | 7.1 km || 
|-id=480 bgcolor=#C2FFFF
| 32480 ||  || — || September 20, 2000 || Socorro || LINEAR || L5 || align=right | 30 km || 
|-id=481 bgcolor=#d6d6d6
| 32481 ||  || — || September 30, 2000 || Anderson Mesa || LONEOS || EOS || align=right | 6.1 km || 
|-id=482 bgcolor=#C2FFFF
| 32482 ||  || — || September 29, 2000 || Anderson Mesa || LONEOS || L5 || align=right | 28 km || 
|-id=483 bgcolor=#d6d6d6
| 32483 ||  || — || September 19, 2000 || Anderson Mesa || LONEOS || — || align=right | 8.2 km || 
|-id=484 bgcolor=#E9E9E9
| 32484 ||  || — || October 4, 2000 || Socorro || LINEAR || — || align=right | 13 km || 
|-id=485 bgcolor=#d6d6d6
| 32485 ||  || — || October 1, 2000 || Socorro || LINEAR || — || align=right | 9.9 km || 
|-id=486 bgcolor=#d6d6d6
| 32486 ||  || — || October 2, 2000 || Anderson Mesa || LONEOS || — || align=right | 8.6 km || 
|-id=487 bgcolor=#d6d6d6
| 32487 ||  || — || October 2, 2000 || Anderson Mesa || LONEOS || — || align=right | 5.4 km || 
|-id=488 bgcolor=#d6d6d6
| 32488 ||  || — || October 5, 2000 || Socorro || LINEAR || — || align=right | 6.0 km || 
|-id=489 bgcolor=#d6d6d6
| 32489 ||  || — || October 24, 2000 || Socorro || LINEAR || — || align=right | 5.9 km || 
|-id=490 bgcolor=#E9E9E9
| 32490 ||  || — || October 25, 2000 || Socorro || LINEAR || — || align=right | 7.8 km || 
|-id=491 bgcolor=#E9E9E9
| 32491 ||  || — || October 30, 2000 || Socorro || LINEAR || — || align=right | 5.4 km || 
|-id=492 bgcolor=#E9E9E9
| 32492 ||  || — || November 1, 2000 || Socorro || LINEAR || — || align=right | 5.4 km || 
|-id=493 bgcolor=#E9E9E9
| 32493 ||  || — || November 18, 2000 || Socorro || LINEAR || EUN || align=right | 4.7 km || 
|-id=494 bgcolor=#d6d6d6
| 32494 ||  || — || November 30, 2000 || Socorro || LINEAR || EOS || align=right | 8.2 km || 
|-id=495 bgcolor=#E9E9E9
| 32495 ||  || — || November 25, 2000 || Socorro || LINEAR || — || align=right | 8.3 km || 
|-id=496 bgcolor=#C2FFFF
| 32496 ||  || — || November 18, 2000 || Socorro || LINEAR || L5 || align=right | 48 km || 
|-id=497 bgcolor=#E9E9E9
| 32497 ||  || — || December 4, 2000 || Socorro || LINEAR || EUN || align=right | 6.9 km || 
|-id=498 bgcolor=#C2FFFF
| 32498 ||  || — || December 5, 2000 || Socorro || LINEAR || L4 || align=right | 22 km || 
|-id=499 bgcolor=#C2FFFF
| 32499 ||  || — || December 19, 2000 || Haleakala || NEAT || L5 || align=right | 39 km || 
|-id=500 bgcolor=#E9E9E9
| 32500 ||  || — || December 30, 2000 || Socorro || LINEAR || — || align=right | 3.3 km || 
|}

32501–32600 

|-bgcolor=#C2FFFF
| 32501 ||  || — || December 22, 2000 || Socorro || LINEAR || L5 || align=right | 36 km || 
|-id=502 bgcolor=#d6d6d6
| 32502 ||  || — || January 26, 2001 || Socorro || LINEAR || — || align=right | 6.9 km || 
|-id=503 bgcolor=#E9E9E9
| 32503 ||  || — || March 18, 2001 || Socorro || LINEAR || MAR || align=right | 6.7 km || 
|-id=504 bgcolor=#fefefe
| 32504 ||  || — || April 21, 2001 || Socorro || LINEAR || H || align=right | 1.9 km || 
|-id=505 bgcolor=#E9E9E9
| 32505 ||  || — || May 18, 2001 || Socorro || LINEAR || MAR || align=right | 6.0 km || 
|-id=506 bgcolor=#fefefe
| 32506 ||  || — || May 21, 2001 || Socorro || LINEAR || — || align=right | 2.9 km || 
|-id=507 bgcolor=#E9E9E9
| 32507 ||  || — || June 12, 2001 || Palomar || NEAT || DOR || align=right | 7.0 km || 
|-id=508 bgcolor=#d6d6d6
| 32508 ||  || — || June 19, 2001 || Haleakala || NEAT || — || align=right | 8.8 km || 
|-id=509 bgcolor=#E9E9E9
| 32509 ||  || — || June 28, 2001 || Haleakala || NEAT || — || align=right | 4.8 km || 
|-id=510 bgcolor=#fefefe
| 32510 || 2001 NS || — || July 12, 2001 || Reedy Creek || J. Broughton || — || align=right | 5.2 km || 
|-id=511 bgcolor=#B88A00
| 32511 ||  || — || July 9, 2001 || Socorro || LINEAR || unusual || align=right | 17 km || 
|-id=512 bgcolor=#E9E9E9
| 32512 ||  || — || July 20, 2001 || Socorro || LINEAR || — || align=right | 6.7 km || 
|-id=513 bgcolor=#C2FFFF
| 32513 ||  || — || July 19, 2001 || Palomar || NEAT || L5 || align=right | 28 km || 
|-id=514 bgcolor=#E9E9E9
| 32514 ||  || — || July 19, 2001 || Palomar || NEAT || MIT || align=right | 10 km || 
|-id=515 bgcolor=#fefefe
| 32515 ||  || — || July 22, 2001 || Palomar || NEAT || — || align=right | 3.3 km || 
|-id=516 bgcolor=#fefefe
| 32516 ||  || — || July 16, 2001 || Anderson Mesa || LONEOS || V || align=right | 2.4 km || 
|-id=517 bgcolor=#E9E9E9
| 32517 ||  || — || July 21, 2001 || Palomar || NEAT || — || align=right | 6.2 km || 
|-id=518 bgcolor=#E9E9E9
| 32518 ||  || — || July 19, 2001 || Anderson Mesa || LONEOS || — || align=right | 2.8 km || 
|-id=519 bgcolor=#fefefe
| 32519 ||  || — || July 21, 2001 || Anderson Mesa || LONEOS || NYS || align=right | 4.8 km || 
|-id=520 bgcolor=#E9E9E9
| 32520 ||  || — || July 21, 2001 || Anderson Mesa || LONEOS || GEF || align=right | 4.0 km || 
|-id=521 bgcolor=#E9E9E9
| 32521 ||  || — || July 29, 2001 || Socorro || LINEAR || — || align=right | 4.8 km || 
|-id=522 bgcolor=#fefefe
| 32522 Judiepersons ||  ||  || July 29, 2001 || Socorro || LINEAR || V || align=right | 2.5 km || 
|-id=523 bgcolor=#d6d6d6
| 32523 ||  || — || July 27, 2001 || Palomar || NEAT || — || align=right | 9.8 km || 
|-id=524 bgcolor=#d6d6d6
| 32524 ||  || — || July 20, 2001 || Anderson Mesa || LONEOS || — || align=right | 8.9 km || 
|-id=525 bgcolor=#fefefe
| 32525 ||  || — || July 21, 2001 || Anderson Mesa || LONEOS || NYS || align=right | 1.7 km || 
|-id=526 bgcolor=#d6d6d6
| 32526 ||  || — || July 25, 2001 || Palomar || NEAT || EOS || align=right | 8.6 km || 
|-id=527 bgcolor=#E9E9E9
| 32527 Junko ||  ||  || July 28, 2001 || Anderson Mesa || LONEOS || HOF || align=right | 11 km || 
|-id=528 bgcolor=#d6d6d6
| 32528 ||  || — || July 29, 2001 || Socorro || LINEAR || — || align=right | 18 km || 
|-id=529 bgcolor=#E9E9E9
| 32529 ||  || — || August 10, 2001 || Haleakala || NEAT || DOR || align=right | 6.7 km || 
|-id=530 bgcolor=#fefefe
| 32530 ||  || — || August 12, 2001 || Ametlla de Mar || J. Nomen || — || align=right | 4.8 km || 
|-id=531 bgcolor=#E9E9E9
| 32531 Ulrikababiaková ||  ||  || August 13, 2001 || Ondřejov || P. Kušnirák || EUN || align=right | 5.7 km || 
|-id=532 bgcolor=#C7FF8F
| 32532 Thereus ||  ||  || August 9, 2001 || Palomar || NEAT || centaur || align=right | 87 km || 
|-id=533 bgcolor=#fefefe
| 32533 Tranpham ||  ||  || August 11, 2001 || Socorro || LINEAR || — || align=right | 3.3 km || 
|-id=534 bgcolor=#d6d6d6
| 32534 ||  || — || August 11, 2001 || Palomar || NEAT || slow || align=right | 14 km || 
|-id=535 bgcolor=#E9E9E9
| 32535 ||  || — || August 11, 2001 || Palomar || NEAT || GEF || align=right | 2.6 km || 
|-id=536 bgcolor=#d6d6d6
| 32536 ||  || — || August 11, 2001 || Palomar || NEAT || EOS || align=right | 21 km || 
|-id=537 bgcolor=#fefefe
| 32537 ||  || — || August 13, 2001 || Haleakala || NEAT || — || align=right | 1.5 km || 
|-id=538 bgcolor=#E9E9E9
| 32538 ||  || — || August 15, 2001 || Haleakala || NEAT || — || align=right | 1.8 km || 
|-id=539 bgcolor=#E9E9E9
| 32539 ||  || — || August 14, 2001 || Haleakala || NEAT || slow || align=right | 3.8 km || 
|-id=540 bgcolor=#d6d6d6
| 32540 ||  || — || August 13, 2001 || Haleakala || NEAT || — || align=right | 11 km || 
|-id=541 bgcolor=#fefefe
| 32541 ||  || — || August 17, 2001 || Ametlla de Mar || J. Nomen || V || align=right | 3.0 km || 
|-id=542 bgcolor=#d6d6d6
| 32542 ||  || — || August 16, 2001 || Socorro || LINEAR || 3:2 || align=right | 13 km || 
|-id=543 bgcolor=#E9E9E9
| 32543 ||  || — || August 16, 2001 || Socorro || LINEAR || — || align=right | 2.4 km || 
|-id=544 bgcolor=#fefefe
| 32544 Debjaniroy ||  ||  || August 16, 2001 || Socorro || LINEAR || — || align=right | 2.3 km || 
|-id=545 bgcolor=#E9E9E9
| 32545 ||  || — || August 16, 2001 || Socorro || LINEAR || GEF || align=right | 5.9 km || 
|-id=546 bgcolor=#d6d6d6
| 32546 ||  || — || August 16, 2001 || Socorro || LINEAR || THM || align=right | 8.5 km || 
|-id=547 bgcolor=#fefefe
| 32547 Shandroff ||  ||  || August 16, 2001 || Socorro || LINEAR || — || align=right | 2.1 km || 
|-id=548 bgcolor=#d6d6d6
| 32548 ||  || — || August 16, 2001 || Socorro || LINEAR || EOS || align=right | 5.9 km || 
|-id=549 bgcolor=#E9E9E9
| 32549 Taricco ||  ||  || August 16, 2001 || Socorro || LINEAR || — || align=right | 2.1 km || 
|-id=550 bgcolor=#fefefe
| 32550 Sharonthomas ||  ||  || August 16, 2001 || Socorro || LINEAR || V || align=right | 2.3 km || 
|-id=551 bgcolor=#fefefe
| 32551 ||  || — || August 16, 2001 || Socorro || LINEAR || EUT || align=right | 1.6 km || 
|-id=552 bgcolor=#fefefe
| 32552 Jennithomas ||  ||  || August 16, 2001 || Socorro || LINEAR || — || align=right | 2.2 km || 
|-id=553 bgcolor=#d6d6d6
| 32553 ||  || — || August 16, 2001 || Socorro || LINEAR || 7:4 || align=right | 12 km || 
|-id=554 bgcolor=#d6d6d6
| 32554 ||  || — || August 16, 2001 || Socorro || LINEAR || — || align=right | 8.0 km || 
|-id=555 bgcolor=#E9E9E9
| 32555 ||  || — || August 16, 2001 || Socorro || LINEAR || — || align=right | 10 km || 
|-id=556 bgcolor=#fefefe
| 32556 Jennivibber ||  ||  || August 16, 2001 || Socorro || LINEAR || V || align=right | 2.7 km || 
|-id=557 bgcolor=#d6d6d6
| 32557 ||  || — || August 16, 2001 || Socorro || LINEAR || KOR || align=right | 3.9 km || 
|-id=558 bgcolor=#d6d6d6
| 32558 ||  || — || August 16, 2001 || Socorro || LINEAR || ALA || align=right | 15 km || 
|-id=559 bgcolor=#fefefe
| 32559 ||  || — || August 16, 2001 || Socorro || LINEAR || NYS || align=right | 2.6 km || 
|-id=560 bgcolor=#fefefe
| 32560 ||  || — || August 16, 2001 || Socorro || LINEAR || — || align=right | 5.1 km || 
|-id=561 bgcolor=#E9E9E9
| 32561 Waldron ||  ||  || August 16, 2001 || Socorro || LINEAR || — || align=right | 2.9 km || 
|-id=562 bgcolor=#E9E9E9
| 32562 Caseywarner ||  ||  || August 16, 2001 || Socorro || LINEAR || — || align=right | 3.3 km || 
|-id=563 bgcolor=#d6d6d6
| 32563 Nicolezaidi ||  ||  || August 16, 2001 || Socorro || LINEAR || KOR || align=right | 4.0 km || 
|-id=564 bgcolor=#E9E9E9
| 32564 Glass ||  ||  || August 20, 2001 || Terre Haute || C. Wolfe || — || align=right | 5.1 km || 
|-id=565 bgcolor=#E9E9E9
| 32565 ||  || — || August 17, 2001 || Socorro || LINEAR || EUN || align=right | 4.8 km || 
|-id=566 bgcolor=#d6d6d6
| 32566 ||  || — || August 17, 2001 || Socorro || LINEAR || EOS || align=right | 5.6 km || 
|-id=567 bgcolor=#E9E9E9
| 32567 ||  || — || August 17, 2001 || Socorro || LINEAR || GEF || align=right | 6.4 km || 
|-id=568 bgcolor=#fefefe
| 32568 ||  || — || August 18, 2001 || Socorro || LINEAR || — || align=right | 2.6 km || 
|-id=569 bgcolor=#d6d6d6
| 32569 Deming ||  ||  || August 20, 2001 || Terre Haute || C. Wolfe || — || align=right | 11 km || 
|-id=570 bgcolor=#E9E9E9
| 32570 Peruindiana ||  ||  || August 20, 2001 || Terre Haute || C. Wolfe || — || align=right | 8.2 km || 
|-id=571 bgcolor=#d6d6d6
| 32571 Brayton ||  ||  || August 20, 2001 || Terre Haute || C. Wolfe || — || align=right | 8.3 km || 
|-id=572 bgcolor=#fefefe
| 32572 ||  || — || August 16, 2001 || Socorro || LINEAR || — || align=right | 5.5 km || 
|-id=573 bgcolor=#d6d6d6
| 32573 ||  || — || August 16, 2001 || Socorro || LINEAR || KOR || align=right | 3.3 km || 
|-id=574 bgcolor=#d6d6d6
| 32574 ||  || — || August 16, 2001 || Socorro || LINEAR || — || align=right | 9.1 km || 
|-id=575 bgcolor=#FA8072
| 32575 ||  || — || August 16, 2001 || Socorro || LINEAR || — || align=right | 2.2 km || 
|-id=576 bgcolor=#d6d6d6
| 32576 ||  || — || August 16, 2001 || Socorro || LINEAR || — || align=right | 8.1 km || 
|-id=577 bgcolor=#E9E9E9
| 32577 ||  || — || August 17, 2001 || Palomar || NEAT || — || align=right | 5.2 km || 
|-id=578 bgcolor=#d6d6d6
| 32578 ||  || — || August 22, 2001 || Socorro || LINEAR || — || align=right | 17 km || 
|-id=579 bgcolor=#fefefe
| 32579 Allendavia ||  ||  || August 17, 2001 || Socorro || LINEAR || V || align=right | 2.6 km || 
|-id=580 bgcolor=#fefefe
| 32580 Avbalasingam ||  ||  || August 18, 2001 || Socorro || LINEAR || V || align=right | 1.5 km || 
|-id=581 bgcolor=#FA8072
| 32581 ||  || — || August 21, 2001 || Socorro || LINEAR || — || align=right | 2.7 km || 
|-id=582 bgcolor=#fefefe
| 32582 Mayachandar ||  ||  || August 18, 2001 || Socorro || LINEAR || MAS || align=right | 1.9 km || 
|-id=583 bgcolor=#E9E9E9
| 32583 ||  || — || August 18, 2001 || Socorro || LINEAR || HNS || align=right | 5.4 km || 
|-id=584 bgcolor=#E9E9E9
| 32584 ||  || — || August 18, 2001 || Anderson Mesa || LONEOS || HNS || align=right | 3.0 km || 
|-id=585 bgcolor=#fefefe
| 32585 ||  || — || August 18, 2001 || Anderson Mesa || LONEOS || FLO || align=right | 3.7 km || 
|-id=586 bgcolor=#d6d6d6
| 32586 ||  || — || August 17, 2001 || Socorro || LINEAR || — || align=right | 11 km || 
|-id=587 bgcolor=#E9E9E9
| 32587 ||  || — || August 17, 2001 || Socorro || LINEAR || — || align=right | 2.9 km || 
|-id=588 bgcolor=#fefefe
| 32588 ||  || — || August 19, 2001 || Socorro || LINEAR || — || align=right | 3.2 km || 
|-id=589 bgcolor=#d6d6d6
| 32589 ||  || — || August 20, 2001 || Socorro || LINEAR || — || align=right | 8.8 km || 
|-id=590 bgcolor=#fefefe
| 32590 Cynthiachen ||  ||  || August 20, 2001 || Socorro || LINEAR || V || align=right | 1.9 km || 
|-id=591 bgcolor=#d6d6d6
| 32591 ||  || — || August 22, 2001 || Socorro || LINEAR || EOS || align=right | 8.8 km || 
|-id=592 bgcolor=#E9E9E9
| 32592 ||  || — || August 22, 2001 || Socorro || LINEAR || — || align=right | 4.6 km || 
|-id=593 bgcolor=#fefefe
| 32593 Crotty ||  ||  || August 22, 2001 || Socorro || LINEAR || — || align=right | 2.9 km || 
|-id=594 bgcolor=#E9E9E9
| 32594 Nathandeng ||  ||  || August 24, 2001 || Socorro || LINEAR || — || align=right | 2.8 km || 
|-id=595 bgcolor=#fefefe
| 32595 ||  || — || August 25, 2001 || Palomar || NEAT || V || align=right | 1.5 km || 
|-id=596 bgcolor=#fefefe
| 32596 Čepek ||  ||  || August 29, 2001 || Kleť || M. Tichý || V || align=right | 2.0 km || 
|-id=597 bgcolor=#d6d6d6
| 32597 ||  || — || August 23, 2001 || Anderson Mesa || LONEOS || — || align=right | 4.2 km || 
|-id=598 bgcolor=#E9E9E9
| 32598 ||  || — || August 23, 2001 || Anderson Mesa || LONEOS || AST || align=right | 5.2 km || 
|-id=599 bgcolor=#E9E9E9
| 32599 ||  || — || August 23, 2001 || Anderson Mesa || LONEOS || HEN || align=right | 2.8 km || 
|-id=600 bgcolor=#d6d6d6
| 32600 ||  || — || August 25, 2001 || Socorro || LINEAR || — || align=right | 6.8 km || 
|}

32601–32700 

|-bgcolor=#d6d6d6
| 32601 ||  || — || August 26, 2001 || Palomar || NEAT || — || align=right | 7.8 km || 
|-id=602 bgcolor=#d6d6d6
| 32602 ||  || — || August 21, 2001 || Socorro || LINEAR || EOS || align=right | 9.4 km || 
|-id=603 bgcolor=#d6d6d6
| 32603 Ariaeppinger ||  ||  || August 22, 2001 || Socorro || LINEAR || — || align=right | 5.4 km || 
|-id=604 bgcolor=#fefefe
| 32604 ||  || — || August 23, 2001 || Anderson Mesa || LONEOS || MAS || align=right | 1.5 km || 
|-id=605 bgcolor=#d6d6d6
| 32605 Lucy ||  ||  || August 23, 2001 || Desert Eagle || W. K. Y. Yeung || — || align=right | 7.2 km || 
|-id=606 bgcolor=#d6d6d6
| 32606 ||  || — || August 23, 2001 || Anderson Mesa || LONEOS || — || align=right | 6.5 km || 
|-id=607 bgcolor=#E9E9E9
| 32607 ||  || — || August 23, 2001 || Anderson Mesa || LONEOS || — || align=right | 6.2 km || 
|-id=608 bgcolor=#fefefe
| 32608 Hallas ||  ||  || August 24, 2001 || Goodricke-Pigott || R. A. Tucker || FLO || align=right | 2.6 km || 
|-id=609 bgcolor=#d6d6d6
| 32609 Jamesfagan ||  ||  || August 24, 2001 || Socorro || LINEAR || — || align=right | 6.7 km || 
|-id=610 bgcolor=#d6d6d6
| 32610 Siennafink ||  ||  || August 24, 2001 || Socorro || LINEAR || KOR || align=right | 4.7 km || 
|-id=611 bgcolor=#d6d6d6
| 32611 Ananyaganesh ||  ||  || August 25, 2001 || Socorro || LINEAR || KOR || align=right | 3.7 km || 
|-id=612 bgcolor=#fefefe
| 32612 Ghatare ||  ||  || August 25, 2001 || Socorro || LINEAR || — || align=right | 3.1 km || 
|-id=613 bgcolor=#fefefe
| 32613 Tseyuenman ||  ||  || August 27, 2001 || Desert Eagle || W. K. Y. Yeung || NYS || align=right | 1.8 km || 
|-id=614 bgcolor=#fefefe
| 32614 Hacegarcia ||  ||  || August 20, 2001 || Socorro || LINEAR || — || align=right | 2.8 km || 
|-id=615 bgcolor=#C2FFFF
| 32615 ||  || — || August 19, 2001 || Socorro || LINEAR || L5 || align=right | 36 km || 
|-id=616 bgcolor=#E9E9E9
| 32616 Nadinehan ||  ||  || August 19, 2001 || Socorro || LINEAR || — || align=right | 3.0 km || 
|-id=617 bgcolor=#fefefe
| 32617 ||  || — || August 18, 2001 || Anderson Mesa || LONEOS || V || align=right | 1.7 km || 
|-id=618 bgcolor=#E9E9E9
| 32618 Leungkamcheung ||  ||  || August 31, 2001 || Desert Eagle || W. K. Y. Yeung || — || align=right | 4.4 km || 
|-id=619 bgcolor=#fefefe
| 32619 ||  || — || August 24, 2001 || Anderson Mesa || LONEOS || — || align=right | 3.1 km || 
|-id=620 bgcolor=#E9E9E9
| 32620 ||  || — || August 24, 2001 || Anderson Mesa || LONEOS || — || align=right | 4.5 km || 
|-id=621 bgcolor=#E9E9E9
| 32621 Talcott || 2001 RZ ||  || September 8, 2001 || Goodricke-Pigott || R. A. Tucker || MAR || align=right | 6.8 km || 
|-id=622 bgcolor=#fefefe
| 32622 Yuewaichun ||  ||  || September 11, 2001 || Desert Eagle || W. K. Y. Yeung || FLO || align=right | 1.7 km || 
|-id=623 bgcolor=#E9E9E9
| 32623 Samuelkahn ||  ||  || September 7, 2001 || Socorro || LINEAR || — || align=right | 2.7 km || 
|-id=624 bgcolor=#d6d6d6
| 32624 ||  || — || September 12, 2001 || Palomar || NEAT || THM || align=right | 8.3 km || 
|-id=625 bgcolor=#E9E9E9
| 32625 ||  || — || September 15, 2001 || Ametlla de Mar || J. Nomen || — || align=right | 5.0 km || 
|-id=626 bgcolor=#fefefe
| 32626 ||  || — || September 10, 2001 || Socorro || LINEAR || V || align=right | 3.4 km || 
|-id=627 bgcolor=#d6d6d6
| 32627 ||  || — || September 10, 2001 || Socorro || LINEAR || — || align=right | 9.2 km || 
|-id=628 bgcolor=#fefefe
| 32628 Lazorik ||  ||  || September 10, 2001 || Socorro || LINEAR || V || align=right | 2.2 km || 
|-id=629 bgcolor=#d6d6d6
| 32629 ||  || — || September 10, 2001 || Socorro || LINEAR || — || align=right | 8.2 km || 
|-id=630 bgcolor=#fefefe
| 32630 Ethanlevy ||  ||  || September 10, 2001 || Socorro || LINEAR || V || align=right | 2.0 km || 
|-id=631 bgcolor=#fefefe
| 32631 Majzoub ||  ||  || September 10, 2001 || Socorro || LINEAR || FLO || align=right | 3.0 km || 
|-id=632 bgcolor=#fefefe
| 32632 ||  || — || September 10, 2001 || Socorro || LINEAR || NYS || align=right | 2.0 km || 
|-id=633 bgcolor=#d6d6d6
| 32633 Honguyang ||  ||  || September 11, 2001 || Anderson Mesa || LONEOS || THM || align=right | 7.2 km || 
|-id=634 bgcolor=#E9E9E9
| 32634 Sonjamichaluk ||  ||  || September 12, 2001 || Socorro || LINEAR || WIT || align=right | 2.9 km || 
|-id=635 bgcolor=#E9E9E9
| 32635 || 2001 SN || — || September 16, 2001 || Fountain Hills || Fountain Hills Obs. || — || align=right | 3.4 km || 
|-id=636 bgcolor=#fefefe
| 32636 ||  || — || September 17, 2001 || Socorro || LINEAR || — || align=right | 1.7 km || 
|-id=637 bgcolor=#E9E9E9
| 32637 || 2021 P-L || — || September 24, 1960 || Palomar || PLS || KON || align=right | 6.5 km || 
|-id=638 bgcolor=#fefefe
| 32638 || 2042 P-L || — || September 24, 1960 || Palomar || PLS || — || align=right | 3.1 km || 
|-id=639 bgcolor=#fefefe
| 32639 || 2050 P-L || — || September 24, 1960 || Palomar || PLS || NYS || align=right | 1.5 km || 
|-id=640 bgcolor=#E9E9E9
| 32640 || 2531 P-L || — || September 24, 1960 || Palomar || PLS || — || align=right | 3.8 km || 
|-id=641 bgcolor=#E9E9E9
| 32641 || 2595 P-L || — || September 24, 1960 || Palomar || PLS || — || align=right | 2.0 km || 
|-id=642 bgcolor=#d6d6d6
| 32642 || 2601 P-L || — || September 24, 1960 || Palomar || PLS || — || align=right | 10 km || 
|-id=643 bgcolor=#fefefe
| 32643 || 2609 P-L || — || September 24, 1960 || Palomar || PLS || — || align=right | 1.8 km || 
|-id=644 bgcolor=#fefefe
| 32644 || 2723 P-L || — || September 24, 1960 || Palomar || PLS || FLO || align=right | 2.1 km || 
|-id=645 bgcolor=#d6d6d6
| 32645 || 2763 P-L || — || September 24, 1960 || Palomar || PLS || — || align=right | 5.9 km || 
|-id=646 bgcolor=#d6d6d6
| 32646 || 3010 P-L || — || September 24, 1960 || Palomar || PLS || SAN || align=right | 6.0 km || 
|-id=647 bgcolor=#d6d6d6
| 32647 || 3109 P-L || — || September 24, 1960 || Palomar || PLS || NAE || align=right | 7.2 km || 
|-id=648 bgcolor=#fefefe
| 32648 || 3538 P-L || — || October 17, 1960 || Palomar || PLS || — || align=right | 3.5 km || 
|-id=649 bgcolor=#fefefe
| 32649 || 4056 P-L || — || September 24, 1960 || Palomar || PLS || NYS || align=right | 1.5 km || 
|-id=650 bgcolor=#E9E9E9
| 32650 || 4070 P-L || — || September 24, 1960 || Palomar || PLS || — || align=right | 3.8 km || 
|-id=651 bgcolor=#E9E9E9
| 32651 || 4208 P-L || — || September 24, 1960 || Palomar || PLS || — || align=right | 3.4 km || 
|-id=652 bgcolor=#fefefe
| 32652 || 4319 P-L || — || September 24, 1960 || Palomar || PLS || — || align=right | 1.4 km || 
|-id=653 bgcolor=#E9E9E9
| 32653 || 4635 P-L || — || September 24, 1960 || Palomar || PLS || — || align=right | 2.0 km || 
|-id=654 bgcolor=#d6d6d6
| 32654 || 4640 P-L || — || September 24, 1960 || Palomar || PLS || — || align=right | 7.3 km || 
|-id=655 bgcolor=#fefefe
| 32655 || 4692 P-L || — || September 24, 1960 || Palomar || PLS || NYS || align=right | 3.6 km || 
|-id=656 bgcolor=#E9E9E9
| 32656 || 4711 P-L || — || September 24, 1960 || Palomar || PLS || AEO || align=right | 2.2 km || 
|-id=657 bgcolor=#E9E9E9
| 32657 || 4721 P-L || — || September 24, 1960 || Palomar || PLS || HEN || align=right | 3.0 km || 
|-id=658 bgcolor=#fefefe
| 32658 || 4800 P-L || — || September 24, 1960 || Palomar || PLS || NYS || align=right | 1.3 km || 
|-id=659 bgcolor=#d6d6d6
| 32659 || 4804 P-L || — || September 24, 1960 || Palomar || PLS || — || align=right | 3.6 km || 
|-id=660 bgcolor=#d6d6d6
| 32660 || 4826 P-L || — || September 24, 1960 || Palomar || PLS || KOR || align=right | 3.5 km || 
|-id=661 bgcolor=#fefefe
| 32661 || 4848 P-L || — || September 24, 1960 || Palomar || PLS || NYS || align=right | 4.5 km || 
|-id=662 bgcolor=#d6d6d6
| 32662 || 4900 P-L || — || September 24, 1960 || Palomar || PLS || — || align=right | 9.1 km || 
|-id=663 bgcolor=#fefefe
| 32663 || 5553 P-L || — || October 17, 1960 || Palomar || PLS || — || align=right | 2.2 km || 
|-id=664 bgcolor=#E9E9E9
| 32664 || 6072 P-L || — || September 24, 1960 || Palomar || PLS || — || align=right | 6.8 km || 
|-id=665 bgcolor=#E9E9E9
| 32665 || 6107 P-L || — || September 24, 1960 || Palomar || PLS || — || align=right | 3.0 km || 
|-id=666 bgcolor=#fefefe
| 32666 || 6124 P-L || — || September 24, 1960 || Palomar || PLS || ERI || align=right | 4.1 km || 
|-id=667 bgcolor=#E9E9E9
| 32667 || 6180 P-L || — || September 24, 1960 || Palomar || PLS || — || align=right | 2.3 km || 
|-id=668 bgcolor=#E9E9E9
| 32668 || 6278 P-L || — || September 24, 1960 || Palomar || PLS || — || align=right | 6.1 km || 
|-id=669 bgcolor=#d6d6d6
| 32669 || 6287 P-L || — || September 24, 1960 || Palomar || PLS || — || align=right | 6.6 km || 
|-id=670 bgcolor=#E9E9E9
| 32670 || 6323 P-L || — || September 24, 1960 || Palomar || PLS || NEM || align=right | 4.4 km || 
|-id=671 bgcolor=#E9E9E9
| 32671 || 6537 P-L || — || September 24, 1960 || Palomar || PLS || — || align=right | 3.9 km || 
|-id=672 bgcolor=#d6d6d6
| 32672 || 6720 P-L || — || September 24, 1960 || Palomar || PLS || — || align=right | 4.2 km || 
|-id=673 bgcolor=#fefefe
| 32673 || 6742 P-L || — || September 24, 1960 || Palomar || PLS || — || align=right | 1.8 km || 
|-id=674 bgcolor=#fefefe
| 32674 || 6750 P-L || — || September 24, 1960 || Palomar || PLS || NYS || align=right | 4.4 km || 
|-id=675 bgcolor=#d6d6d6
| 32675 || 6755 P-L || — || September 24, 1960 || Palomar || PLS || — || align=right | 5.3 km || 
|-id=676 bgcolor=#E9E9E9
| 32676 || 6802 P-L || — || September 24, 1960 || Palomar || PLS || — || align=right | 1.8 km || 
|-id=677 bgcolor=#d6d6d6
| 32677 || 6806 P-L || — || September 24, 1960 || Palomar || PLS || KOR || align=right | 3.1 km || 
|-id=678 bgcolor=#fefefe
| 32678 || 7566 P-L || — || October 17, 1960 || Palomar || PLS || V || align=right | 2.5 km || 
|-id=679 bgcolor=#d6d6d6
| 32679 || 1070 T-1 || — || March 25, 1971 || Palomar || PLS || ALA || align=right | 8.1 km || 
|-id=680 bgcolor=#d6d6d6
| 32680 || 1095 T-1 || — || March 25, 1971 || Palomar || PLS || — || align=right | 9.5 km || 
|-id=681 bgcolor=#d6d6d6
| 32681 || 1166 T-1 || — || March 25, 1971 || Palomar || PLS || — || align=right | 4.5 km || 
|-id=682 bgcolor=#E9E9E9
| 32682 || 1177 T-1 || — || March 25, 1971 || Palomar || PLS || — || align=right | 4.8 km || 
|-id=683 bgcolor=#E9E9E9
| 32683 || 1202 T-1 || — || March 25, 1971 || Palomar || PLS || — || align=right | 2.0 km || 
|-id=684 bgcolor=#E9E9E9
| 32684 || 1269 T-1 || — || March 25, 1971 || Palomar || PLS || GEF || align=right | 3.4 km || 
|-id=685 bgcolor=#fefefe
| 32685 || 1294 T-1 || — || March 25, 1971 || Palomar || PLS || NYS || align=right | 1.5 km || 
|-id=686 bgcolor=#d6d6d6
| 32686 || 2072 T-1 || — || March 25, 1971 || Palomar || PLS || THM || align=right | 7.2 km || 
|-id=687 bgcolor=#E9E9E9
| 32687 || 3166 T-1 || — || March 26, 1971 || Palomar || PLS || MAR || align=right | 3.4 km || 
|-id=688 bgcolor=#E9E9E9
| 32688 || 4025 T-1 || — || March 26, 1971 || Palomar || PLS || — || align=right | 2.6 km || 
|-id=689 bgcolor=#fefefe
| 32689 || 4043 T-1 || — || March 26, 1971 || Palomar || PLS || ERI || align=right | 5.0 km || 
|-id=690 bgcolor=#d6d6d6
| 32690 || 4075 T-1 || — || March 26, 1971 || Palomar || PLS || HYG || align=right | 5.6 km || 
|-id=691 bgcolor=#d6d6d6
| 32691 || 4269 T-1 || — || March 26, 1971 || Palomar || PLS || THM || align=right | 5.3 km || 
|-id=692 bgcolor=#fefefe
| 32692 || 4329 T-1 || — || March 26, 1971 || Palomar || PLS || — || align=right | 4.8 km || 
|-id=693 bgcolor=#fefefe
| 32693 || 4339 T-1 || — || March 26, 1971 || Palomar || PLS || V || align=right | 1.8 km || 
|-id=694 bgcolor=#fefefe
| 32694 || 4408 T-1 || — || March 26, 1971 || Palomar || PLS || — || align=right | 4.3 km || 
|-id=695 bgcolor=#E9E9E9
| 32695 || 1016 T-2 || — || September 29, 1973 || Palomar || PLS || — || align=right | 7.6 km || 
|-id=696 bgcolor=#E9E9E9
| 32696 || 1055 T-2 || — || September 29, 1973 || Palomar || PLS || — || align=right | 2.9 km || 
|-id=697 bgcolor=#fefefe
| 32697 || 1069 T-2 || — || September 29, 1973 || Palomar || PLS || FLO || align=right | 1.6 km || 
|-id=698 bgcolor=#fefefe
| 32698 || 1104 T-2 || — || September 29, 1973 || Palomar || PLS || NYS || align=right | 2.2 km || 
|-id=699 bgcolor=#fefefe
| 32699 || 1286 T-2 || — || September 29, 1973 || Palomar || PLS || FLO || align=right | 1.6 km || 
|-id=700 bgcolor=#E9E9E9
| 32700 || 1351 T-2 || — || September 29, 1973 || Palomar || PLS || XIZ || align=right | 4.9 km || 
|}

32701–32800 

|-bgcolor=#E9E9E9
| 32701 || 1353 T-2 || — || September 29, 1973 || Palomar || PLS || — || align=right | 3.0 km || 
|-id=702 bgcolor=#E9E9E9
| 32702 || 2028 T-2 || — || September 29, 1973 || Palomar || PLS || — || align=right | 5.4 km || 
|-id=703 bgcolor=#E9E9E9
| 32703 || 2087 T-2 || — || September 29, 1973 || Palomar || PLS || — || align=right | 8.7 km || 
|-id=704 bgcolor=#d6d6d6
| 32704 || 2140 T-2 || — || September 29, 1973 || Palomar || PLS || MEL || align=right | 17 km || 
|-id=705 bgcolor=#d6d6d6
| 32705 || 2157 T-2 || — || September 29, 1973 || Palomar || PLS || URS || align=right | 9.4 km || 
|-id=706 bgcolor=#E9E9E9
| 32706 || 2212 T-2 || — || September 29, 1973 || Palomar || PLS || — || align=right | 4.0 km || 
|-id=707 bgcolor=#d6d6d6
| 32707 || 3089 T-2 || — || September 30, 1973 || Palomar || PLS || THM || align=right | 7.6 km || 
|-id=708 bgcolor=#d6d6d6
| 32708 || 3160 T-2 || — || September 30, 1973 || Palomar || PLS || — || align=right | 7.4 km || 
|-id=709 bgcolor=#E9E9E9
| 32709 || 3355 T-2 || — || September 25, 1973 || Palomar || PLS || — || align=right | 6.4 km || 
|-id=710 bgcolor=#fefefe
| 32710 || 4063 T-2 || — || September 29, 1973 || Palomar || PLS || V || align=right | 1.5 km || 
|-id=711 bgcolor=#E9E9E9
| 32711 || 4132 T-2 || — || September 29, 1973 || Palomar || PLS || WIT || align=right | 2.5 km || 
|-id=712 bgcolor=#E9E9E9
| 32712 || 4135 T-2 || — || September 29, 1973 || Palomar || PLS || — || align=right | 8.7 km || 
|-id=713 bgcolor=#d6d6d6
| 32713 || 4159 T-2 || — || September 29, 1973 || Palomar || PLS || — || align=right | 7.8 km || 
|-id=714 bgcolor=#fefefe
| 32714 || 5008 T-2 || — || September 25, 1973 || Palomar || PLS || V || align=right | 1.9 km || 
|-id=715 bgcolor=#E9E9E9
| 32715 || 5105 T-2 || — || September 25, 1973 || Palomar || PLS || — || align=right | 8.9 km || 
|-id=716 bgcolor=#E9E9E9
| 32716 || 5133 T-2 || — || September 25, 1973 || Palomar || PLS || — || align=right | 6.2 km || 
|-id=717 bgcolor=#fefefe
| 32717 || 5155 T-2 || — || September 25, 1973 || Palomar || PLS || FLO || align=right | 3.1 km || 
|-id=718 bgcolor=#fefefe
| 32718 || 1103 T-3 || — || October 17, 1977 || Palomar || PLS || — || align=right | 2.1 km || 
|-id=719 bgcolor=#E9E9E9
| 32719 || 1153 T-3 || — || October 17, 1977 || Palomar || PLS || — || align=right | 2.0 km || 
|-id=720 bgcolor=#C2FFFF
| 32720 Simoeisios || 2131 T-3 ||  || October 16, 1977 || Palomar || PLS || L5 || align=right | 21 km || 
|-id=721 bgcolor=#E9E9E9
| 32721 || 2335 T-3 || — || October 16, 1977 || Palomar || PLS || — || align=right | 3.5 km || 
|-id=722 bgcolor=#E9E9E9
| 32722 || 3340 T-3 || — || October 16, 1977 || Palomar || PLS || MIS || align=right | 3.8 km || 
|-id=723 bgcolor=#E9E9E9
| 32723 || 4028 T-3 || — || October 16, 1977 || Palomar || PLS || — || align=right | 8.2 km || 
|-id=724 bgcolor=#d6d6d6
| 32724 Woerlitz || 4029 T-3 ||  || October 16, 1977 || Palomar || PLS || HIL3:2 || align=right | 11 km || 
|-id=725 bgcolor=#fefefe
| 32725 || 4057 T-3 || — || October 16, 1977 || Palomar || PLS || — || align=right | 2.0 km || 
|-id=726 bgcolor=#C2FFFF
| 32726 Chromios || 4179 T-3 ||  || October 16, 1977 || Palomar || PLS || L5 || align=right | 21 km || 
|-id=727 bgcolor=#fefefe
| 32727 || 4268 T-3 || — || October 16, 1977 || Palomar || PLS || — || align=right | 1.8 km || 
|-id=728 bgcolor=#fefefe
| 32728 || 4517 T-3 || — || October 16, 1977 || Palomar || PLS || V || align=right | 1.3 km || 
|-id=729 bgcolor=#E9E9E9
| 32729 || 5179 T-3 || — || October 16, 1977 || Palomar || PLS || CLO || align=right | 11 km || 
|-id=730 bgcolor=#fefefe
| 32730 Lamarr || 1951 RX ||  || September 4, 1951 || Heidelberg || K. Reinmuth || — || align=right | 3.1 km || 
|-id=731 bgcolor=#fefefe
| 32731 Annaivanovna ||  ||  || July 25, 1968 || Cerro El Roble || G. A. Plyugin, Yu. A. Belyaev || — || align=right | 2.6 km || 
|-id=732 bgcolor=#d6d6d6
| 32732 ||  || — || September 30, 1975 || Palomar || S. J. Bus || KOR || align=right | 2.8 km || 
|-id=733 bgcolor=#E9E9E9
| 32733 || 1976 SB || — || September 23, 1976 || Harvard Observatory || Harvard Obs. || — || align=right | 2.7 km || 
|-id=734 bgcolor=#d6d6d6
| 32734 Kryukov || 1978 RM ||  || September 1, 1978 || Nauchnij || N. S. Chernykh || THM || align=right | 10 km || 
|-id=735 bgcolor=#fefefe
| 32735 Strekalov ||  ||  || September 27, 1978 || Nauchnij || L. I. Chernykh || — || align=right | 7.9 km || 
|-id=736 bgcolor=#fefefe
| 32736 ||  || — || October 27, 1978 || Palomar || C. M. Olmstead || NYS || align=right | 1.3 km || 
|-id=737 bgcolor=#fefefe
| 32737 ||  || — || October 27, 1978 || Palomar || C. M. Olmstead || — || align=right | 1.8 km || 
|-id=738 bgcolor=#fefefe
| 32738 ||  || — || November 1, 1978 || Caussols || K. Tomita || — || align=right | 5.2 km || 
|-id=739 bgcolor=#d6d6d6
| 32739 ||  || — || November 7, 1978 || Palomar || E. F. Helin, S. J. Bus || — || align=right | 6.4 km || 
|-id=740 bgcolor=#E9E9E9
| 32740 ||  || — || November 7, 1978 || Palomar || E. F. Helin, S. J. Bus || — || align=right | 6.8 km || 
|-id=741 bgcolor=#d6d6d6
| 32741 ||  || — || November 7, 1978 || Palomar || E. F. Helin, S. J. Bus || THM || align=right | 5.2 km || 
|-id=742 bgcolor=#E9E9E9
| 32742 ||  || — || November 7, 1978 || Palomar || E. F. Helin, S. J. Bus || — || align=right | 6.9 km || 
|-id=743 bgcolor=#d6d6d6
| 32743 ||  || — || June 25, 1979 || Siding Spring || E. F. Helin, S. J. Bus || — || align=right | 6.8 km || 
|-id=744 bgcolor=#fefefe
| 32744 ||  || — || June 25, 1979 || Siding Spring || E. F. Helin, S. J. Bus || — || align=right | 4.0 km || 
|-id=745 bgcolor=#fefefe
| 32745 ||  || — || February 28, 1981 || Siding Spring || S. J. Bus || — || align=right | 2.4 km || 
|-id=746 bgcolor=#E9E9E9
| 32746 ||  || — || March 2, 1981 || Siding Spring || S. J. Bus || MAR || align=right | 2.9 km || 
|-id=747 bgcolor=#d6d6d6
| 32747 ||  || — || March 7, 1981 || Siding Spring || S. J. Bus || — || align=right | 7.3 km || 
|-id=748 bgcolor=#fefefe
| 32748 ||  || — || March 1, 1981 || Siding Spring || S. J. Bus || — || align=right | 1.6 km || 
|-id=749 bgcolor=#fefefe
| 32749 ||  || — || March 1, 1981 || Siding Spring || S. J. Bus || — || align=right | 3.4 km || 
|-id=750 bgcolor=#d6d6d6
| 32750 ||  || — || March 1, 1981 || Siding Spring || S. J. Bus || slow? || align=right | 8.0 km || 
|-id=751 bgcolor=#d6d6d6
| 32751 ||  || — || March 1, 1981 || Siding Spring || S. J. Bus || — || align=right | 8.2 km || 
|-id=752 bgcolor=#E9E9E9
| 32752 ||  || — || March 1, 1981 || Siding Spring || S. J. Bus || — || align=right | 5.0 km || 
|-id=753 bgcolor=#d6d6d6
| 32753 ||  || — || March 1, 1981 || Siding Spring || S. J. Bus || — || align=right | 6.6 km || 
|-id=754 bgcolor=#d6d6d6
| 32754 ||  || — || March 1, 1981 || Siding Spring || S. J. Bus || — || align=right | 6.7 km || 
|-id=755 bgcolor=#fefefe
| 32755 ||  || — || March 1, 1981 || Siding Spring || S. J. Bus || — || align=right | 2.4 km || 
|-id=756 bgcolor=#fefefe
| 32756 ||  || — || March 1, 1981 || Siding Spring || S. J. Bus || FLO || align=right | 1.9 km || 
|-id=757 bgcolor=#d6d6d6
| 32757 ||  || — || March 2, 1981 || Siding Spring || S. J. Bus || — || align=right | 8.0 km || 
|-id=758 bgcolor=#fefefe
| 32758 ||  || — || March 2, 1981 || Siding Spring || S. J. Bus || NYS || align=right | 1.4 km || 
|-id=759 bgcolor=#fefefe
| 32759 ||  || — || March 2, 1981 || Siding Spring || S. J. Bus || — || align=right | 1.6 km || 
|-id=760 bgcolor=#E9E9E9
| 32760 ||  || — || March 6, 1981 || Siding Spring || S. J. Bus || — || align=right | 5.9 km || 
|-id=761 bgcolor=#fefefe
| 32761 ||  || — || March 2, 1981 || Siding Spring || S. J. Bus || — || align=right | 2.5 km || 
|-id=762 bgcolor=#d6d6d6
| 32762 ||  || — || March 7, 1981 || Siding Spring || S. J. Bus || — || align=right | 6.6 km || 
|-id=763 bgcolor=#fefefe
| 32763 ||  || — || March 2, 1981 || Siding Spring || S. J. Bus || — || align=right | 1.8 km || 
|-id=764 bgcolor=#fefefe
| 32764 ||  || — || March 7, 1981 || Siding Spring || S. J. Bus || NYS || align=right | 1.4 km || 
|-id=765 bgcolor=#E9E9E9
| 32765 ||  || — || March 2, 1981 || Siding Spring || S. J. Bus || — || align=right | 7.7 km || 
|-id=766 bgcolor=#fefefe
| 32766 Voskresenskoe ||  ||  || October 21, 1982 || Nauchnij || L. V. Zhuravleva || — || align=right | 3.3 km || 
|-id=767 bgcolor=#E9E9E9
| 32767 ||  || — || September 1, 1983 || La Silla || H. Debehogne || — || align=right | 3.2 km || 
|-id=768 bgcolor=#fefefe
| 32768 Alexandripatov ||  ||  || September 5, 1983 || Nauchnij || L. V. Zhuravleva || — || align=right | 2.1 km || 
|-id=769 bgcolor=#fefefe
| 32769 ||  || — || January 8, 1984 || Anderson Mesa || E. Bowell || — || align=right | 6.6 km || 
|-id=770 bgcolor=#fefefe
| 32770 Starchik ||  ||  || December 23, 1984 || Nauchnij || L. G. Karachkina || — || align=right | 4.5 km || 
|-id=771 bgcolor=#fefefe
| 32771 ||  || — || September 6, 1985 || La Silla || H. Debehogne || — || align=right | 3.4 km || 
|-id=772 bgcolor=#fefefe
| 32772 || 1986 JL || — || May 11, 1986 || Caussols || C. Pollas || H || align=right | 6.0 km || 
|-id=773 bgcolor=#E9E9E9
| 32773 || 1986 TD || — || October 5, 1986 || Piwnice || M. Antal || PAL || align=right | 5.9 km || 
|-id=774 bgcolor=#fefefe
| 32774 || 1986 VZ || — || November 3, 1986 || Kleť || A. Mrkos || — || align=right | 3.7 km || 
|-id=775 bgcolor=#fefefe
| 32775 ||  || — || November 29, 1986 || Toyota || K. Suzuki, T. Urata || NYS || align=right | 2.6 km || 
|-id=776 bgcolor=#E9E9E9
| 32776 Nriag ||  ||  || May 29, 1987 || Palomar || C. S. Shoemaker, E. M. Shoemaker || — || align=right | 6.3 km || 
|-id=777 bgcolor=#E9E9E9
| 32777 ||  || — || August 21, 1987 || Kleť || Z. Vávrová || — || align=right | 3.9 km || 
|-id=778 bgcolor=#E9E9E9
| 32778 ||  || — || February 11, 1988 || La Silla || E. W. Elst || GEF || align=right | 3.6 km || 
|-id=779 bgcolor=#fefefe
| 32779 ||  || — || February 11, 1988 || La Silla || E. W. Elst || — || align=right | 1.6 km || 
|-id=780 bgcolor=#fefefe
| 32780 ||  || — || February 13, 1988 || La Silla || E. W. Elst || — || align=right | 4.1 km || 
|-id=781 bgcolor=#fefefe
| 32781 ||  || — || February 17, 1988 || La Silla || E. W. Elst || — || align=right | 3.9 km || 
|-id=782 bgcolor=#d6d6d6
| 32782 ||  || — || September 14, 1988 || Cerro Tololo || S. J. Bus || — || align=right | 8.3 km || 
|-id=783 bgcolor=#E9E9E9
| 32783 ||  || — || September 14, 1988 || Cerro Tololo || S. J. Bus || — || align=right | 4.6 km || 
|-id=784 bgcolor=#E9E9E9
| 32784 || 1989 AR || — || January 4, 1989 || Kushiro || S. Ueda, H. Kaneda || — || align=right | 4.7 km || 
|-id=785 bgcolor=#fefefe
| 32785 ||  || — || February 10, 1989 || Gekko || Y. Oshima || FLO || align=right | 2.4 km || 
|-id=786 bgcolor=#fefefe
| 32786 ||  || — || April 3, 1989 || La Silla || E. W. Elst || — || align=right | 2.4 km || 
|-id=787 bgcolor=#fefefe
| 32787 ||  || — || September 26, 1989 || La Silla || E. W. Elst || NYS || align=right | 2.2 km || 
|-id=788 bgcolor=#d6d6d6
| 32788 ||  || — || September 26, 1989 || La Silla || E. W. Elst || THM || align=right | 8.8 km || 
|-id=789 bgcolor=#fefefe
| 32789 ||  || — || September 26, 1989 || La Silla || E. W. Elst || — || align=right | 6.4 km || 
|-id=790 bgcolor=#fefefe
| 32790 ||  || — || September 23, 1989 || La Silla || H. Debehogne || MAS || align=right | 2.8 km || 
|-id=791 bgcolor=#d6d6d6
| 32791 ||  || — || October 3, 1989 || Cerro Tololo || S. J. Bus || — || align=right | 13 km || 
|-id=792 bgcolor=#d6d6d6
| 32792 ||  || — || October 7, 1989 || La Silla || E. W. Elst || EOS || align=right | 4.4 km || 
|-id=793 bgcolor=#fefefe
| 32793 ||  || — || October 3, 1989 || La Silla || H. Debehogne || NYS || align=right | 2.5 km || 
|-id=794 bgcolor=#C2FFFF
| 32794 ||  || — || October 30, 1989 || Cerro Tololo || S. J. Bus || L5 || align=right | 14 km || 
|-id=795 bgcolor=#d6d6d6
| 32795 ||  || — || November 21, 1989 || Gekko || Y. Oshima || — || align=right | 7.7 km || 
|-id=796 bgcolor=#E9E9E9
| 32796 Ehrenfest ||  ||  || March 2, 1990 || La Silla || E. W. Elst || EUN || align=right | 5.2 km || 
|-id=797 bgcolor=#E9E9E9
| 32797 || 1990 OJ || — || July 18, 1990 || Palomar || E. F. Helin || INO || align=right | 4.4 km || 
|-id=798 bgcolor=#d6d6d6
| 32798 ||  || — || July 29, 1990 || Palomar || H. E. Holt || — || align=right | 7.6 km || 
|-id=799 bgcolor=#fefefe
| 32799 ||  || — || August 22, 1990 || Palomar || H. E. Holt || — || align=right | 3.2 km || 
|-id=800 bgcolor=#fefefe
| 32800 ||  || — || August 17, 1990 || Palomar || P. Rose || H || align=right | 2.8 km || 
|}

32801–32900 

|-bgcolor=#fefefe
| 32801 ||  || — || September 15, 1990 || Palomar || H. E. Holt || FLO || align=right | 2.1 km || 
|-id=802 bgcolor=#fefefe
| 32802 || 1990 SK || — || September 20, 1990 || Siding Spring || R. H. McNaught || — || align=right | 4.2 km || 
|-id=803 bgcolor=#fefefe
| 32803 ||  || — || September 18, 1990 || Palomar || H. E. Holt || — || align=right | 2.7 km || 
|-id=804 bgcolor=#fefefe
| 32804 ||  || — || September 17, 1990 || Palomar || H. E. Holt || — || align=right | 3.3 km || 
|-id=805 bgcolor=#fefefe
| 32805 ||  || — || September 18, 1990 || Palomar || H. E. Holt || — || align=right | 2.9 km || 
|-id=806 bgcolor=#fefefe
| 32806 ||  || — || September 22, 1990 || La Silla || H. Debehogne || MAS || align=right | 2.1 km || 
|-id=807 bgcolor=#fefefe
| 32807 Quarenghi ||  ||  || September 24, 1990 || Nauchnij || L. V. Zhuravleva, G. R. Kastelʹ || — || align=right | 6.0 km || 
|-id=808 bgcolor=#d6d6d6
| 32808 Bischoff ||  ||  || October 10, 1990 || Tautenburg Observatory || L. D. Schmadel, F. Börngen || HYG || align=right | 9.1 km || 
|-id=809 bgcolor=#d6d6d6
| 32809 Sommerfeld ||  ||  || October 10, 1990 || Tautenburg Observatory || F. Börngen, L. D. Schmadel || TEL || align=right | 3.7 km || 
|-id=810 bgcolor=#fefefe
| 32810 Steinbach ||  ||  || October 10, 1990 || Tautenburg Observatory || L. D. Schmadel, F. Börngen || NYS || align=right | 3.2 km || 
|-id=811 bgcolor=#C2FFFF
| 32811 Apisaon ||  ||  || October 14, 1990 || Tautenburg Observatory || F. Börngen, L. D. Schmadel || L5 || align=right | 28 km || 
|-id=812 bgcolor=#fefefe
| 32812 ||  || — || October 16, 1990 || La Silla || E. W. Elst || FLO || align=right | 2.3 km || 
|-id=813 bgcolor=#fefefe
| 32813 ||  || — || November 16, 1990 || La Silla || E. W. Elst || — || align=right | 3.2 km || 
|-id=814 bgcolor=#fefefe
| 32814 || 1990 XZ || — || December 15, 1990 || Palomar || E. F. Helin || H || align=right | 2.4 km || 
|-id=815 bgcolor=#fefefe
| 32815 ||  || — || April 14, 1991 || Kitami || K. Endate, K. Watanabe || NYS || align=right | 7.0 km || 
|-id=816 bgcolor=#E9E9E9
| 32816 ||  || — || August 2, 1991 || La Silla || E. W. Elst || — || align=right | 4.0 km || 
|-id=817 bgcolor=#E9E9E9
| 32817 ||  || — || August 6, 1991 || La Silla || E. W. Elst || — || align=right | 4.7 km || 
|-id=818 bgcolor=#E9E9E9
| 32818 ||  || — || August 14, 1991 || La Silla || E. W. Elst || RAF || align=right | 3.9 km || 
|-id=819 bgcolor=#E9E9E9
| 32819 ||  || — || August 8, 1991 || Palomar || H. E. Holt || — || align=right | 6.4 km || 
|-id=820 bgcolor=#E9E9E9
| 32820 ||  || — || August 8, 1991 || Palomar || H. E. Holt || — || align=right | 7.5 km || 
|-id=821 bgcolor=#E9E9E9
| 32821 Posch ||  ||  || September 9, 1991 || Tautenburg Observatory || L. D. Schmadel, F. Börngen || — || align=right | 6.4 km || 
|-id=822 bgcolor=#fefefe
| 32822 ||  || — || September 15, 1991 || Palomar || H. E. Holt || — || align=right | 1.9 km || 
|-id=823 bgcolor=#E9E9E9
| 32823 ||  || — || October 1, 1991 || Kitt Peak || Spacewatch || — || align=right | 5.0 km || 
|-id=824 bgcolor=#fefefe
| 32824 ||  || — || February 2, 1992 || La Silla || E. W. Elst || — || align=right | 5.6 km || 
|-id=825 bgcolor=#fefefe
| 32825 ||  || — || February 2, 1992 || La Silla || E. W. Elst || FLO || align=right | 2.2 km || 
|-id=826 bgcolor=#fefefe
| 32826 ||  || — || February 26, 1992 || Kushiro || S. Ueda, H. Kaneda || FLO || align=right | 2.8 km || 
|-id=827 bgcolor=#FA8072
| 32827 ||  || — || February 28, 1992 || Kitt Peak || Spacewatch || — || align=right | 2.4 km || 
|-id=828 bgcolor=#d6d6d6
| 32828 ||  || — || February 29, 1992 || La Silla || UESAC || — || align=right | 4.6 km || 
|-id=829 bgcolor=#fefefe
| 32829 ||  || — || February 29, 1992 || La Silla || UESAC || — || align=right | 2.0 km || 
|-id=830 bgcolor=#fefefe
| 32830 ||  || — || February 29, 1992 || La Silla || UESAC || V || align=right | 4.2 km || 
|-id=831 bgcolor=#fefefe
| 32831 ||  || — || February 29, 1992 || Kitt Peak || Spacewatch || — || align=right | 2.7 km || 
|-id=832 bgcolor=#d6d6d6
| 32832 ||  || — || March 5, 1992 || Kitt Peak || Spacewatch || HYG || align=right | 6.5 km || 
|-id=833 bgcolor=#fefefe
| 32833 ||  || — || March 6, 1992 || Kitt Peak || Spacewatch || MAS || align=right | 1.7 km || 
|-id=834 bgcolor=#fefefe
| 32834 ||  || — || March 1, 1992 || La Silla || UESAC || — || align=right | 3.8 km || 
|-id=835 bgcolor=#fefefe
| 32835 ||  || — || March 1, 1992 || La Silla || UESAC || V || align=right | 2.5 km || 
|-id=836 bgcolor=#fefefe
| 32836 ||  || — || March 2, 1992 || La Silla || UESAC || — || align=right | 2.3 km || 
|-id=837 bgcolor=#d6d6d6
| 32837 ||  || — || March 1, 1992 || La Silla || UESAC || — || align=right | 8.7 km || 
|-id=838 bgcolor=#fefefe
| 32838 ||  || — || March 2, 1992 || La Silla || UESAC || V || align=right | 3.1 km || 
|-id=839 bgcolor=#d6d6d6
| 32839 ||  || — || March 2, 1992 || La Silla || UESAC || HYG || align=right | 8.2 km || 
|-id=840 bgcolor=#fefefe
| 32840 ||  || — || March 2, 1992 || La Silla || UESAC || — || align=right | 2.3 km || 
|-id=841 bgcolor=#d6d6d6
| 32841 ||  || — || March 2, 1992 || La Silla || UESAC || THM || align=right | 14 km || 
|-id=842 bgcolor=#d6d6d6
| 32842 ||  || — || March 2, 1992 || La Silla || UESAC || — || align=right | 8.5 km || 
|-id=843 bgcolor=#fefefe
| 32843 ||  || — || March 3, 1992 || La Silla || UESAC || — || align=right | 3.8 km || 
|-id=844 bgcolor=#d6d6d6
| 32844 ||  || — || March 8, 1992 || La Silla || UESAC || — || align=right | 7.5 km || 
|-id=845 bgcolor=#fefefe
| 32845 ||  || — || March 26, 1992 || Kushiro || S. Ueda, H. Kaneda || NYS || align=right | 2.2 km || 
|-id=846 bgcolor=#d6d6d6
| 32846 ||  || — || April 5, 1992 || Kitt Peak || Spacewatch || — || align=right | 7.0 km || 
|-id=847 bgcolor=#fefefe
| 32847 ||  || — || May 1, 1992 || La Silla || H. Debehogne || NYS || align=right | 7.7 km || 
|-id=848 bgcolor=#E9E9E9
| 32848 || 1992 MD || — || June 29, 1992 || Palomar || H. E. Holt || — || align=right | 3.7 km || 
|-id=849 bgcolor=#fefefe
| 32849 ||  || — || July 26, 1992 || La Silla || E. W. Elst || MAS || align=right | 2.8 km || 
|-id=850 bgcolor=#E9E9E9
| 32850 ||  || — || September 2, 1992 || La Silla || E. W. Elst || — || align=right | 2.7 km || 
|-id=851 bgcolor=#E9E9E9
| 32851 ||  || — || September 2, 1992 || La Silla || E. W. Elst || — || align=right | 3.7 km || 
|-id=852 bgcolor=#E9E9E9
| 32852 ||  || — || September 2, 1992 || La Silla || E. W. Elst || — || align=right | 2.5 km || 
|-id=853 bgcolor=#E9E9E9
| 32853 Döbereiner ||  ||  || September 21, 1992 || Tautenburg Observatory || F. Börngen, L. D. Schmadel || EUN || align=right | 4.6 km || 
|-id=854 bgcolor=#E9E9E9
| 32854 ||  || — || September 30, 1992 || Kitami || K. Endate, K. Watanabe || — || align=right | 4.2 km || 
|-id=855 bgcolor=#E9E9E9
| 32855 Zollitsch ||  ||  || September 24, 1992 || Tautenburg Observatory || L. D. Schmadel, F. Börngen || — || align=right | 5.0 km || 
|-id=856 bgcolor=#E9E9E9
| 32856 ||  || — || September 30, 1992 || Palomar || H. E. Holt || — || align=right | 4.2 km || 
|-id=857 bgcolor=#E9E9E9
| 32857 ||  || — || October 31, 1992 || Uenohara || N. Kawasato || — || align=right | 3.8 km || 
|-id=858 bgcolor=#d6d6d6
| 32858 Kitakamigawa ||  ||  || January 25, 1993 || Geisei || T. Seki || EOS || align=right | 7.6 km || 
|-id=859 bgcolor=#E9E9E9
| 32859 || 1993 EL || — || March 15, 1993 || Catalina Station || T. B. Spahr || — || align=right | 4.1 km || 
|-id=860 bgcolor=#d6d6d6
| 32860 ||  || — || March 17, 1993 || La Silla || UESAC || KOR || align=right | 3.8 km || 
|-id=861 bgcolor=#d6d6d6
| 32861 ||  || — || March 17, 1993 || La Silla || UESAC || KOR || align=right | 5.1 km || 
|-id=862 bgcolor=#fefefe
| 32862 ||  || — || March 17, 1993 || La Silla || UESAC || FLO || align=right | 1.5 km || 
|-id=863 bgcolor=#d6d6d6
| 32863 ||  || — || March 17, 1993 || La Silla || UESAC || KOR || align=right | 3.6 km || 
|-id=864 bgcolor=#d6d6d6
| 32864 ||  || — || March 17, 1993 || La Silla || UESAC || — || align=right | 5.1 km || 
|-id=865 bgcolor=#fefefe
| 32865 ||  || — || March 17, 1993 || La Silla || UESAC || — || align=right | 1.7 km || 
|-id=866 bgcolor=#d6d6d6
| 32866 ||  || — || March 19, 1993 || La Silla || UESAC || KOR || align=right | 3.1 km || 
|-id=867 bgcolor=#d6d6d6
| 32867 ||  || — || March 19, 1993 || La Silla || UESAC || — || align=right | 4.9 km || 
|-id=868 bgcolor=#d6d6d6
| 32868 ||  || — || March 21, 1993 || La Silla || UESAC || — || align=right | 5.6 km || 
|-id=869 bgcolor=#d6d6d6
| 32869 ||  || — || March 21, 1993 || La Silla || UESAC || EOS || align=right | 6.8 km || 
|-id=870 bgcolor=#fefefe
| 32870 ||  || — || March 21, 1993 || La Silla || UESAC || — || align=right | 2.1 km || 
|-id=871 bgcolor=#d6d6d6
| 32871 ||  || — || March 21, 1993 || La Silla || UESAC || KOR || align=right | 4.7 km || 
|-id=872 bgcolor=#d6d6d6
| 32872 ||  || — || March 19, 1993 || La Silla || UESAC || — || align=right | 6.0 km || 
|-id=873 bgcolor=#d6d6d6
| 32873 ||  || — || March 19, 1993 || La Silla || UESAC || KOR || align=right | 3.2 km || 
|-id=874 bgcolor=#d6d6d6
| 32874 ||  || — || March 19, 1993 || La Silla || UESAC || KOR || align=right | 3.9 km || 
|-id=875 bgcolor=#d6d6d6
| 32875 ||  || — || March 19, 1993 || La Silla || UESAC || — || align=right | 4.8 km || 
|-id=876 bgcolor=#d6d6d6
| 32876 ||  || — || March 19, 1993 || La Silla || UESAC || — || align=right | 7.1 km || 
|-id=877 bgcolor=#fefefe
| 32877 ||  || — || March 21, 1993 || La Silla || UESAC || — || align=right | 2.4 km || 
|-id=878 bgcolor=#fefefe
| 32878 || 1993 NX || — || July 12, 1993 || La Silla || E. W. Elst || NYS || align=right | 1.9 km || 
|-id=879 bgcolor=#fefefe
| 32879 ||  || — || July 20, 1993 || La Silla || E. W. Elst || — || align=right | 2.2 km || 
|-id=880 bgcolor=#d6d6d6
| 32880 ||  || — || July 20, 1993 || La Silla || E. W. Elst || THM || align=right | 8.7 km || 
|-id=881 bgcolor=#fefefe
| 32881 ||  || — || July 20, 1993 || La Silla || E. W. Elst || — || align=right | 5.7 km || 
|-id=882 bgcolor=#fefefe
| 32882 ||  || — || September 15, 1993 || La Silla || E. W. Elst || NYS || align=right | 2.7 km || 
|-id=883 bgcolor=#fefefe
| 32883 ||  || — || September 15, 1993 || La Silla || E. W. Elst || NYS || align=right | 6.0 km || 
|-id=884 bgcolor=#fefefe
| 32884 ||  || — || September 16, 1993 || La Silla || H. Debehogne, E. W. Elst || — || align=right | 4.3 km || 
|-id=885 bgcolor=#fefefe
| 32885 ||  || — || October 9, 1993 || La Silla || E. W. Elst || NYS || align=right | 2.4 km || 
|-id=886 bgcolor=#fefefe
| 32886 ||  || — || October 9, 1993 || La Silla || E. W. Elst || NYS || align=right | 4.3 km || 
|-id=887 bgcolor=#fefefe
| 32887 ||  || — || October 9, 1993 || La Silla || E. W. Elst || NYS || align=right | 2.0 km || 
|-id=888 bgcolor=#fefefe
| 32888 ||  || — || October 9, 1993 || La Silla || E. W. Elst || NYS || align=right | 2.1 km || 
|-id=889 bgcolor=#fefefe
| 32889 ||  || — || October 9, 1993 || La Silla || E. W. Elst || NYS || align=right | 1.5 km || 
|-id=890 bgcolor=#FA8072
| 32890 Schwob ||  ||  || January 8, 1994 || Palomar || C. S. Shoemaker, D. H. Levy || H || align=right | 2.2 km || 
|-id=891 bgcolor=#E9E9E9
| 32891 Amatrice ||  ||  || February 9, 1994 || Colleverde || V. S. Casulli || — || align=right | 4.4 km || 
|-id=892 bgcolor=#d6d6d6
| 32892 Prufrock || 1994 DW ||  || February 22, 1994 || La Palma || A. A. Kaas || EOS || align=right | 5.4 km || 
|-id=893 bgcolor=#E9E9E9
| 32893 van der Waals ||  ||  || March 9, 1994 || Caussols || E. W. Elst || WAT || align=right | 7.0 km || 
|-id=894 bgcolor=#d6d6d6
| 32894 ||  || — || May 3, 1994 || Kitt Peak || Spacewatch || — || align=right | 3.4 km || 
|-id=895 bgcolor=#E9E9E9
| 32895 ||  || — || May 4, 1994 || Kitt Peak || Spacewatch || — || align=right | 5.7 km || 
|-id=896 bgcolor=#d6d6d6
| 32896 ||  || — || July 12, 1994 || Catalina Station || T. B. Spahr || — || align=right | 6.5 km || 
|-id=897 bgcolor=#FA8072
| 32897 Curtharris || 1994 PD ||  || August 1, 1994 || Palomar || C. S. Shoemaker, D. H. Levy || — || align=right | 4.1 km || 
|-id=898 bgcolor=#fefefe
| 32898 ||  || — || August 9, 1994 || Palomar || E. F. Helin || FLO || align=right | 5.0 km || 
|-id=899 bgcolor=#d6d6d6
| 32899 Knigge ||  ||  || August 4, 1994 || Tautenburg Observatory || F. Börngen || — || align=right | 12 km || 
|-id=900 bgcolor=#d6d6d6
| 32900 ||  || — || August 10, 1994 || La Silla || E. W. Elst || — || align=right | 5.6 km || 
|}

32901–33000 

|-bgcolor=#d6d6d6
| 32901 ||  || — || August 10, 1994 || La Silla || E. W. Elst || — || align=right | 9.5 km || 
|-id=902 bgcolor=#fefefe
| 32902 ||  || — || August 10, 1994 || La Silla || E. W. Elst || — || align=right | 1.3 km || 
|-id=903 bgcolor=#d6d6d6
| 32903 ||  || — || August 10, 1994 || La Silla || E. W. Elst || — || align=right | 6.3 km || 
|-id=904 bgcolor=#d6d6d6
| 32904 ||  || — || August 12, 1994 || La Silla || E. W. Elst || THM || align=right | 7.3 km || 
|-id=905 bgcolor=#d6d6d6
| 32905 ||  || — || August 12, 1994 || La Silla || E. W. Elst || HYG || align=right | 6.0 km || 
|-id=906 bgcolor=#FFC2E0
| 32906 || 1994 RH || — || September 2, 1994 || Palomar || E. F. Helin, K. J. Lawrence || AMO +1km || align=right | 2.3 km || 
|-id=907 bgcolor=#d6d6d6
| 32907 ||  || — || September 1, 1994 || Kitt Peak || Spacewatch || — || align=right | 11 km || 
|-id=908 bgcolor=#fefefe
| 32908 ||  || — || September 27, 1994 || Kitt Peak || Spacewatch || — || align=right | 2.8 km || 
|-id=909 bgcolor=#fefefe
| 32909 || 1994 TS || — || October 2, 1994 || Kitami || K. Endate, K. Watanabe || — || align=right | 2.3 km || 
|-id=910 bgcolor=#FA8072
| 32910 ||  || — || October 13, 1994 || Kiyosato || S. Otomo || — || align=right | 2.9 km || 
|-id=911 bgcolor=#fefefe
| 32911 Cervara || 1994 VX ||  || November 4, 1994 || Colleverde || V. S. Casulli || — || align=right | 1.9 km || 
|-id=912 bgcolor=#fefefe
| 32912 ||  || — || November 30, 1994 || Oizumi || T. Kobayashi || — || align=right | 4.1 km || 
|-id=913 bgcolor=#fefefe
| 32913 ||  || — || December 31, 1994 || Kitt Peak || Spacewatch || — || align=right | 4.2 km || 
|-id=914 bgcolor=#fefefe
| 32914 ||  || — || January 6, 1995 || Nyukasa || M. Hirasawa, S. Suzuki || FLO || align=right | 3.4 km || 
|-id=915 bgcolor=#fefefe
| 32915 ||  || — || January 30, 1995 || Oizumi || T. Kobayashi || NYS || align=right | 2.1 km || 
|-id=916 bgcolor=#E9E9E9
| 32916 || 1995 CL || — || February 1, 1995 || Oizumi || T. Kobayashi || — || align=right | 6.1 km || 
|-id=917 bgcolor=#fefefe
| 32917 || 1995 CM || — || February 1, 1995 || Oizumi || T. Kobayashi || — || align=right | 1.9 km || 
|-id=918 bgcolor=#fefefe
| 32918 || 1995 CZ || — || February 3, 1995 || Oizumi || T. Kobayashi || NYS || align=right | 3.9 km || 
|-id=919 bgcolor=#fefefe
| 32919 ||  || — || February 3, 1995 || Kitami || K. Endate, K. Watanabe || — || align=right | 3.7 km || 
|-id=920 bgcolor=#fefefe
| 32920 ||  || — || February 1, 1995 || Kitt Peak || Spacewatch || NYS || align=right | 1.7 km || 
|-id=921 bgcolor=#E9E9E9
| 32921 || 1995 EV || — || March 9, 1995 || Stroncone || Santa Lucia Obs. || — || align=right | 3.6 km || 
|-id=922 bgcolor=#fefefe
| 32922 ||  || — || March 1, 1995 || Kitt Peak || Spacewatch || — || align=right | 2.6 km || 
|-id=923 bgcolor=#fefefe
| 32923 ||  || — || April 2, 1995 || Kitt Peak || Spacewatch || — || align=right | 5.3 km || 
|-id=924 bgcolor=#E9E9E9
| 32924 ||  || — || April 6, 1995 || Kitt Peak || Spacewatch || — || align=right | 2.8 km || 
|-id=925 bgcolor=#fefefe
| 32925 || 1995 KF || — || May 24, 1995 || Catalina Station || C. W. Hergenrother || — || align=right | 2.9 km || 
|-id=926 bgcolor=#E9E9E9
| 32926 ||  || — || June 22, 1995 || Kitt Peak || Spacewatch || — || align=right | 4.3 km || 
|-id=927 bgcolor=#d6d6d6
| 32927 ||  || — || July 22, 1995 || Kitt Peak || Spacewatch || — || align=right | 3.3 km || 
|-id=928 bgcolor=#fefefe
| 32928 Xiejialin || 1995 QZ ||  || August 20, 1995 || Xinglong || SCAP || H || align=right | 1.9 km || 
|-id=929 bgcolor=#C2E0FF
| 32929 ||  || — || August 31, 1995 || Mauna Kea || D. C. Jewitt, J. Chen || plutinocritical || align=right | 93 km || 
|-id=930 bgcolor=#d6d6d6
| 32930 ||  || — || September 24, 1995 || Church Stretton || S. P. Laurie || HYG || align=right | 7.3 km || 
|-id=931 bgcolor=#d6d6d6
| 32931 Ferioli ||  ||  || September 26, 1995 || Sormano || P. Sicoli, P. Ghezzi || EMA || align=right | 7.3 km || 
|-id=932 bgcolor=#d6d6d6
| 32932 ||  || — || September 18, 1995 || Kitt Peak || Spacewatch || — || align=right | 5.7 km || 
|-id=933 bgcolor=#d6d6d6
| 32933 ||  || — || September 19, 1995 || Kitt Peak || Spacewatch || — || align=right | 4.5 km || 
|-id=934 bgcolor=#d6d6d6
| 32934 ||  || — || September 19, 1995 || Kitt Peak || Spacewatch || — || align=right | 4.2 km || 
|-id=935 bgcolor=#d6d6d6
| 32935 ||  || — || September 25, 1995 || Kitt Peak || Spacewatch || — || align=right | 5.2 km || 
|-id=936 bgcolor=#d6d6d6
| 32936 ||  || — || September 25, 1995 || Kitt Peak || Spacewatch || — || align=right | 6.6 km || 
|-id=937 bgcolor=#d6d6d6
| 32937 || 1995 TT || — || October 13, 1995 || Oizumi || T. Kobayashi || EOS || align=right | 9.9 km || 
|-id=938 bgcolor=#d6d6d6
| 32938 Ivanopaci ||  ||  || October 15, 1995 || San Marcello || L. Tesi, A. Boattini || — || align=right | 3.7 km || 
|-id=939 bgcolor=#d6d6d6
| 32939 Nasimi ||  ||  || October 24, 1995 || Kleť || Kleť Obs. || — || align=right | 6.3 km || 
|-id=940 bgcolor=#fefefe
| 32940 ||  || — || October 26, 1995 || Oizumi || T. Kobayashi || — || align=right | 3.4 km || 
|-id=941 bgcolor=#d6d6d6
| 32941 ||  || — || October 24, 1995 || Sormano || A. Testa, G. Ventre || — || align=right | 5.9 km || 
|-id=942 bgcolor=#d6d6d6
| 32942 ||  || — || October 27, 1995 || Kushiro || S. Ueda, H. Kaneda || TIR || align=right | 5.2 km || 
|-id=943 bgcolor=#d6d6d6
| 32943 Sandyryan ||  ||  || November 13, 1995 || Haleakala || AMOS || EOS || align=right | 5.7 km || 
|-id=944 bgcolor=#d6d6d6
| 32944 Gussalli ||  ||  || November 19, 1995 || Sormano || P. Sicoli, F. Manca || — || align=right | 8.4 km || 
|-id=945 bgcolor=#d6d6d6
| 32945 Lecce ||  ||  || November 24, 1995 || Colleverde || V. S. Casulli || — || align=right | 5.0 km || 
|-id=946 bgcolor=#d6d6d6
| 32946 ||  || — || November 17, 1995 || Kitt Peak || Spacewatch || EOS || align=right | 4.2 km || 
|-id=947 bgcolor=#d6d6d6
| 32947 ||  || — || December 23, 1995 || Sudbury || D. di Cicco || — || align=right | 4.3 km || 
|-id=948 bgcolor=#d6d6d6
| 32948 ||  || — || December 16, 1995 || Kitt Peak || Spacewatch || — || align=right | 7.0 km || 
|-id=949 bgcolor=#d6d6d6
| 32949 ||  || — || January 14, 1996 || Haleakala || AMOS || THM || align=right | 5.8 km || 
|-id=950 bgcolor=#d6d6d6
| 32950 ||  || — || February 10, 1996 || Xinglong || SCAP || EUP || align=right | 12 km || 
|-id=951 bgcolor=#fefefe
| 32951 ||  || — || March 20, 1996 || Haleakala || NEAT || FLO || align=right | 1.7 km || 
|-id=952 bgcolor=#fefefe
| 32952 ||  || — || March 22, 1996 || La Silla || E. W. Elst || V || align=right | 2.5 km || 
|-id=953 bgcolor=#fefefe
| 32953 ||  || — || April 15, 1996 || La Silla || E. W. Elst || V || align=right | 2.4 km || 
|-id=954 bgcolor=#fefefe
| 32954 ||  || — || April 15, 1996 || La Silla || E. W. Elst || — || align=right | 2.6 km || 
|-id=955 bgcolor=#fefefe
| 32955 ||  || — || April 24, 1996 || Moriyama || Y. Ikari || — || align=right | 2.0 km || 
|-id=956 bgcolor=#fefefe
| 32956 ||  || — || April 18, 1996 || La Silla || E. W. Elst || NYS || align=right | 4.7 km || 
|-id=957 bgcolor=#fefefe
| 32957 ||  || — || April 18, 1996 || La Silla || E. W. Elst || V || align=right | 1.3 km || 
|-id=958 bgcolor=#fefefe
| 32958 ||  || — || April 20, 1996 || La Silla || E. W. Elst || V || align=right | 1.8 km || 
|-id=959 bgcolor=#E9E9E9
| 32959 ||  || — || April 20, 1996 || La Silla || E. W. Elst || — || align=right | 3.4 km || 
|-id=960 bgcolor=#E9E9E9
| 32960 ||  || — || July 14, 1996 || La Silla || E. W. Elst || EUN || align=right | 2.8 km || 
|-id=961 bgcolor=#fefefe
| 32961 || 1996 PS || — || August 9, 1996 || Haleakala || NEAT || V || align=right | 2.3 km || 
|-id=962 bgcolor=#E9E9E9
| 32962 ||  || — || August 11, 1996 || Rand || G. R. Viscome || — || align=right | 2.5 km || 
|-id=963 bgcolor=#E9E9E9
| 32963 ||  || — || August 11, 1996 || Rand || G. R. Viscome || — || align=right | 2.2 km || 
|-id=964 bgcolor=#fefefe
| 32964 ||  || — || August 9, 1996 || Haleakala || NEAT || NYS || align=right | 2.0 km || 
|-id=965 bgcolor=#E9E9E9
| 32965 ||  || — || August 15, 1996 || Haleakala || NEAT || — || align=right | 6.4 km || 
|-id=966 bgcolor=#fefefe
| 32966 ||  || — || August 15, 1996 || Rand || G. R. Viscome || — || align=right | 2.4 km || 
|-id=967 bgcolor=#E9E9E9
| 32967 ||  || — || August 8, 1996 || La Silla || E. W. Elst || — || align=right | 5.3 km || 
|-id=968 bgcolor=#fefefe
| 32968 ||  || — || August 8, 1996 || La Silla || E. W. Elst || NYS || align=right | 2.1 km || 
|-id=969 bgcolor=#E9E9E9
| 32969 Motohikosato ||  ||  || August 6, 1996 || Nanyo || T. Okuni || — || align=right | 4.7 km || 
|-id=970 bgcolor=#fefefe
| 32970 || 1996 QX || — || August 19, 1996 || Kleť || Kleť Obs. || FLO || align=right | 1.9 km || 
|-id=971 bgcolor=#E9E9E9
| 32971 ||  || — || September 8, 1996 || Kitt Peak || Spacewatch || — || align=right | 2.0 km || 
|-id=972 bgcolor=#E9E9E9
| 32972 ||  || — || September 17, 1996 || Kitt Peak || Spacewatch || — || align=right | 6.8 km || 
|-id=973 bgcolor=#E9E9E9
| 32973 ||  || — || October 11, 1996 || Kitami || K. Endate || — || align=right | 3.6 km || 
|-id=974 bgcolor=#d6d6d6
| 32974 ||  || — || October 4, 1996 || Kitt Peak || Spacewatch || EOS || align=right | 5.9 km || 
|-id=975 bgcolor=#E9E9E9
| 32975 ||  || — || October 6, 1996 || Kitt Peak || Spacewatch || — || align=right | 4.9 km || 
|-id=976 bgcolor=#E9E9E9
| 32976 || 1996 VK || — || November 3, 1996 || Oohira || T. Urata || — || align=right | 4.6 km || 
|-id=977 bgcolor=#E9E9E9
| 32977 ||  || — || November 13, 1996 || Oizumi || T. Kobayashi || RAF || align=right | 4.6 km || 
|-id=978 bgcolor=#E9E9E9
| 32978 ||  || — || November 9, 1996 || Xinglong || SCAP || — || align=right | 7.4 km || 
|-id=979 bgcolor=#E9E9E9
| 32979 ||  || — || November 9, 1996 || Xinglong || SCAP || — || align=right | 5.9 km || 
|-id=980 bgcolor=#d6d6d6
| 32980 ||  || — || November 10, 1996 || Kitt Peak || Spacewatch || — || align=right | 6.1 km || 
|-id=981 bgcolor=#d6d6d6
| 32981 ||  || — || November 11, 1996 || Kitt Peak || Spacewatch || THM || align=right | 7.4 km || 
|-id=982 bgcolor=#E9E9E9
| 32982 ||  || — || November 2, 1996 || Xinglong || SCAP || — || align=right | 4.1 km || 
|-id=983 bgcolor=#E9E9E9
| 32983 ||  || — || November 27, 1996 || Xinglong || SCAP || EUN || align=right | 5.8 km || 
|-id=984 bgcolor=#E9E9E9
| 32984 || 1996 XX || — || December 1, 1996 || Chichibu || N. Satō || MAR || align=right | 3.1 km || 
|-id=985 bgcolor=#E9E9E9
| 32985 ||  || — || December 1, 1996 || Kitt Peak || Spacewatch || — || align=right | 3.5 km || 
|-id=986 bgcolor=#E9E9E9
| 32986 ||  || — || December 1, 1996 || Kitt Peak || Spacewatch || MAR || align=right | 5.1 km || 
|-id=987 bgcolor=#E9E9E9
| 32987 Uyuni ||  ||  || December 4, 1996 || Colleverde || V. S. Casulli || MAR || align=right | 3.5 km || 
|-id=988 bgcolor=#d6d6d6
| 32988 ||  || — || December 8, 1996 || Oizumi || T. Kobayashi || EOS || align=right | 6.7 km || 
|-id=989 bgcolor=#fefefe
| 32989 ||  || — || December 5, 1996 || Kitt Peak || Spacewatch || — || align=right | 5.9 km || 
|-id=990 bgcolor=#d6d6d6
| 32990 Sayo-hime ||  ||  || December 30, 1996 || Chichibu || N. Satō || EOS || align=right | 7.9 km || 
|-id=991 bgcolor=#E9E9E9
| 32991 ||  || — || January 4, 1997 || Oizumi || T. Kobayashi || — || align=right | 5.2 km || 
|-id=992 bgcolor=#d6d6d6
| 32992 ||  || — || January 3, 1997 || Kitt Peak || Spacewatch || KOR || align=right | 2.9 km || 
|-id=993 bgcolor=#d6d6d6
| 32993 ||  || — || January 9, 1997 || Oizumi || T. Kobayashi || — || align=right | 8.2 km || 
|-id=994 bgcolor=#E9E9E9
| 32994 ||  || — || January 11, 1997 || Xinglong || SCAP || — || align=right | 7.5 km || 
|-id=995 bgcolor=#d6d6d6
| 32995 ||  || — || January 29, 1997 || Oizumi || T. Kobayashi || — || align=right | 4.8 km || 
|-id=996 bgcolor=#E9E9E9
| 32996 || 1997 CV || — || February 1, 1997 || Oizumi || T. Kobayashi || — || align=right | 4.3 km || 
|-id=997 bgcolor=#d6d6d6
| 32997 ||  || — || February 3, 1997 || Haleakala || NEAT || — || align=right | 7.3 km || 
|-id=998 bgcolor=#d6d6d6
| 32998 ||  || — || February 1, 1997 || Chichibu || N. Satō || — || align=right | 3.9 km || 
|-id=999 bgcolor=#d6d6d6
| 32999 ||  || — || February 6, 1997 || Xinglong || SCAP || FIR || align=right | 16 km || 
|-id=000 bgcolor=#E9E9E9
| 33000 Chenjiansheng ||  ||  || February 11, 1997 || Xinglong || SCAP || — || align=right | 7.1 km || 
|}

References

External links 
 Discovery Circumstances: Numbered Minor Planets (30001)–(35000) (IAU Minor Planet Center)

0032